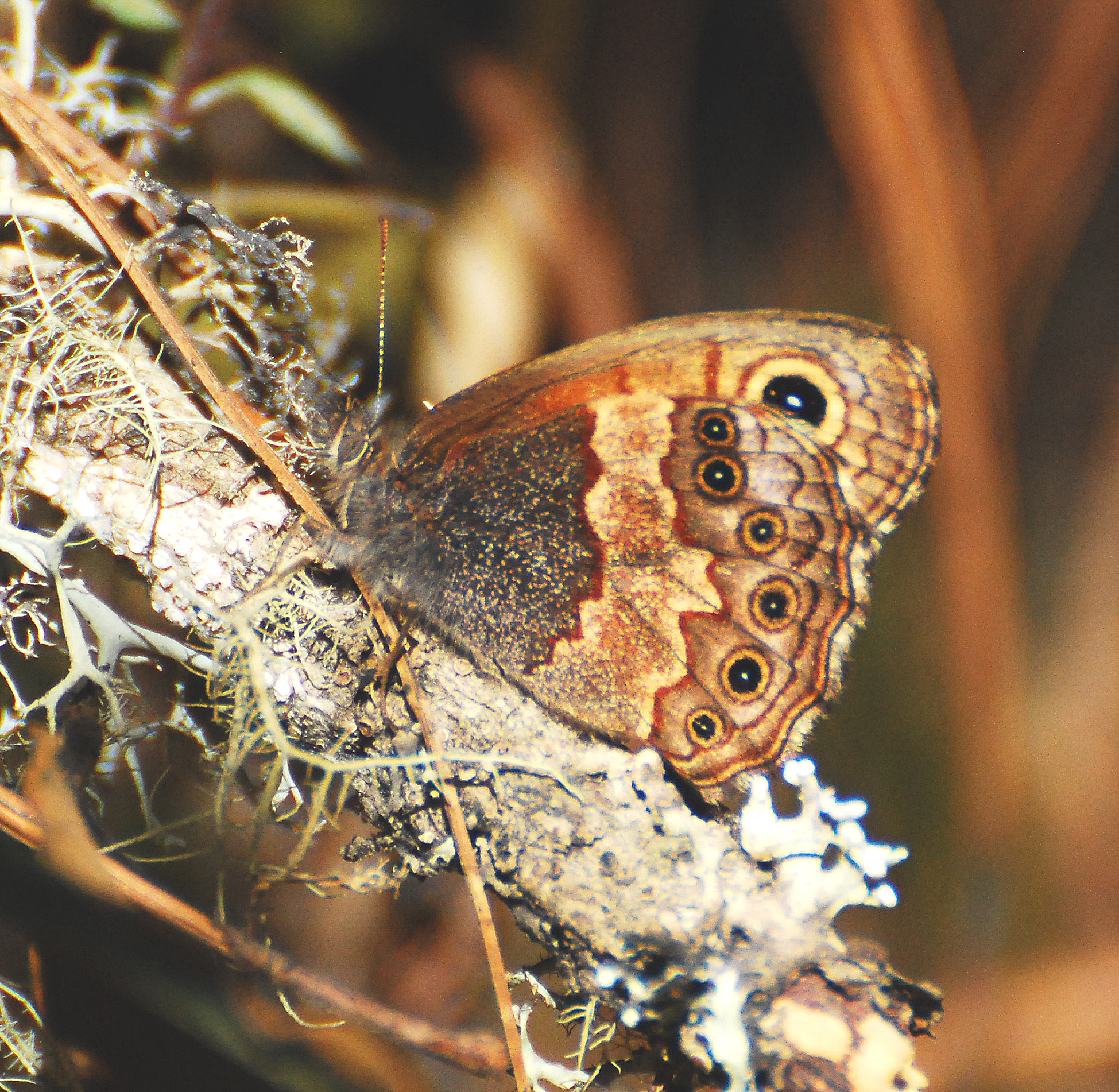
- Arizona pine satyr (Paramacera allyni)

Scientific classification
- Kingdom: Animalia
- Phylum: Arthropoda
- Clade: Pancrustacea
- Class: Insecta
- Order: Lepidoptera
- Family: Nymphalidae
- Subfamily: Satyrinae
- Tribe: Satyrini
- Subtribe: Euptychiina; L. D. Miller

Genera
- About 50

= Euptychiina =

Subtribe of butterflies

The butterfly subtribe Euptychiina (Lepidoptera: Nymphalidae) is a diverse group within the tribe Satyrini, occurring throughout Central and South America, in addition to a few species known from North America. Euptychiina is a predominantly lowland group, with the exception of one Asian taxon Palaeonympha opalina Butler, 1871 and the Andean genus Forsterinaria Gray, 1973. The taxon was erected by Lee Denmar Miller.

== Euptychiina ==
Despite its members being common, this subtribe has been a challenging subject for taxonomic and phylogenetic studies for many years because of their dull coloration, intraspecific variation, lack of clear morphological characters, and morphological homogeneity. However, with the exception of pioneering work by W. Forster and L. D. Miller, the group received little attention from butterfly researchers until recently due to their typically dull brownish coloration. Currently, 50 genera and over 400 described species are recognized within this subtribe, but the group is estimated to contain over 500 species in 70 genera. The current classification of Euptychiina is based on the Lamas checklist, who retained and reorganized many of the genera erected by Forster. Forster described 33 euptychiine genera that are now widely accepted, but since he erected these genera without testing monophyly and synapomorphies, many of his genera have been recovered as polyphyletic or paraphyletic in recent molecular phylogenetic studies.

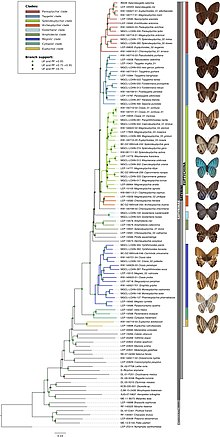
Phylogeny showing relationships of major euptychiine genera

=== History of classification ===
A. Butler was probably the first to propose a systematic classification for many euptychiine taxa, excluding species now in the "Taygetis clade". In his monograph of Euptychia (then used as a catch-all genus to include most euptychiine species), Butler divided the genus into seven groups (Division I to VII). Subsequently, Butler proposed an updated classification for the group and recognized 27 "species groups" within Euptychia sensu Butler (1867). G. Weymer recognized 29 "species group" within Euptychia sensu Butler, in addition to treating Taygetis and Amphidecta in his monograph of Satyridae in the "Macrolepidoptera of the American Faunistic region" by A. Seitz. Based on Weymer (1911)'s classification, Forster (1964) introduced 33 euptychiine genera and his classification is largely retained in Lamas (2004), a work considered as a vital foundation regarding Neotropical butterfly classification. The recent years have seen an explosion of interest in euptychiine systematics, resulting in many changes in generic classification of the group as well as improvement in our understanding of its species diversity. Although the subtribal name was first introduced by L. D. Miller when he treated Euptychiina as a tribal level taxon "Euptychiini", the genus Euptychia Hübner, 1818 was historically used to place many euptychiine species now no longer classified in that genus, perhaps explaining why the generic name Euptychia was used in a much broader sense to include many other euptychiine species. Consequently, Forster included this name "Euptychia" as part of new generic names he described, a trend also followed when the new generic name Atlanteuptychia was introduced for Euptychia ernestina Weymer, 1911. However, other recently described euptychiine genera do not follow this trend (references above).

=== Biology ===
There exist detailed early stage biology (i.e. complete life cycle documented) information for 30 euptychiine species. Larva of euptychiine species often lack body scoli and possessing short head scoli and caudal filaments, but there exist some variation. Hostplant records are known for approximately 100 species, those records are mainly grass and bamboo species, although the genus Euptychia is known to feed on mosses and lycopsids.

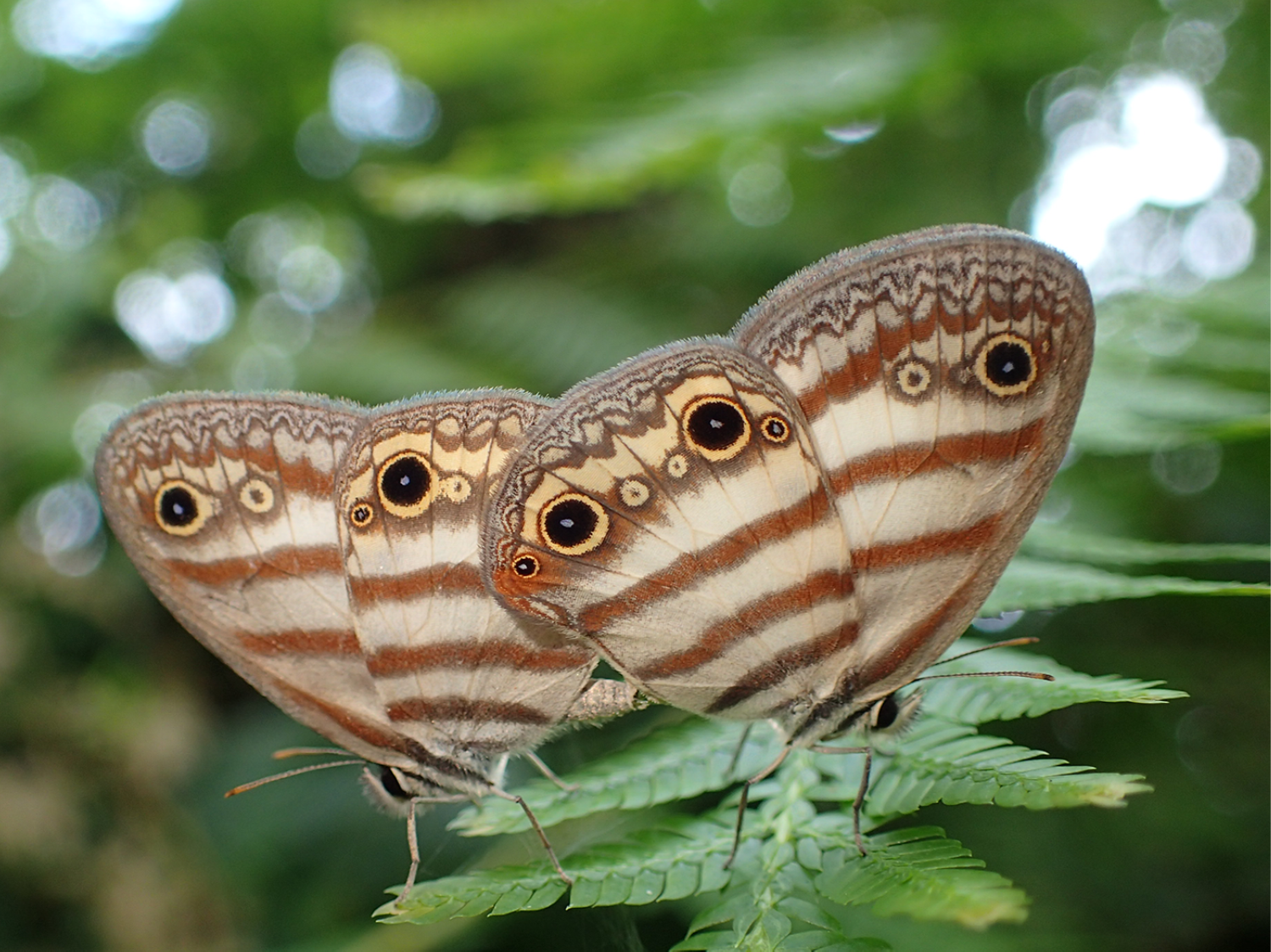
Euptychia westwoodi mating on its host plant (Selaginella species) in western Ecuador.

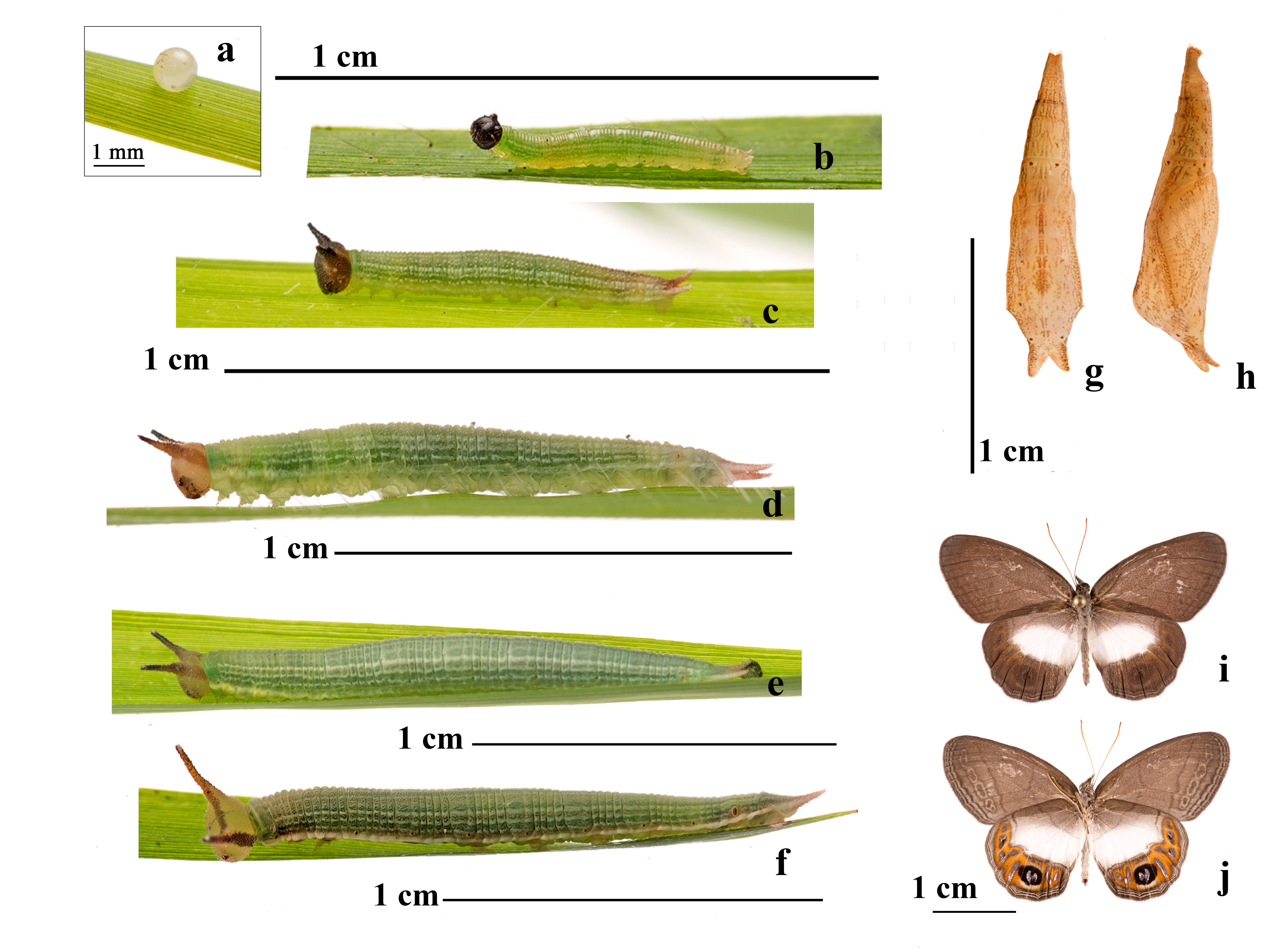
Early stage biology (egg, larva, pupa and adult) of Splendeuptychia quadrina

== Generic classification and species ==
The following genera and species belong to subtribe Euptychina.

genera	species and/or subspecies	images of example species
Amiga Nakahara, Willmott & Espeland, 2019 Type species — Papilio arnaca Fabricius, 1776	A. arnaca (Fabricius, 1776); A. arnaca arnaca (Fabricius, 1776); A. arnaca adela Nakahara & Espeland, 2019; A. arnaca indianacristoi Nakahara & Marín, 2019; A. sericeella (Bates, 1865)	Amiga arnaca indianacristoi
Amphidecta Butler, 1867 Type species — Euptychia pignerator Butler, 1867	A. calliomma (C. Felder & R. Felder, 1862); A. clio (Weymer, 1911); A. pignerator (Butler, 1867); A. pignerator pignerator (Butler, 1867); A. pignerator simplicia Weymer, 1910; A. reynoldsi Sharpe, 1890	Calliomma satyr (Amphidecta calliomma)
Archeuptychia Forster, 1964 Type species — Papilio cluena Drury, 1782	A. cluena (Drury, 1782)	Archeuptychia cluena
Argentaria Huertas & Willmott, 2023 Type species — Euptychia itonis Hewitson, 1862	A. argyropsacas (Bryk, 1953); A. clementia (Butler, 1877); A. clorimena (Stoll, 1790); A. cosmophila (Hübner, 1823); A. hygina (Butler, 1877); A. itonis (Hewitson, 1862); A. jadea (Brévignon & Benmesbah, 2011); A. kendalli (L.D. Miller, 1976); A. libitina (Butler, 1870); A. pagyris (Godart, [1824]); A. quadrina (Butler, 1869); A. salvini (Butler, 1867); A. telesphora (Butler, 1877); A. zischkai (Forster, 1964)	
Atlanteuptychia Freitas, Barbosa & Mielke, 2013 Type species — Euptychia ernestina Weymer, 1911	A. ernestina (Weymer, 1911)	
Caeruleuptychia Forster, 1964 Type species — Euptychia caerulea Butler, 1867	C. aegrota (Butler, 1867); C. aetherialis (Butler, 1867); C. caerulea (Butler, 1869); C. coelestis (Butler, 1867); C. coelica (Hewitson, 1869); C. cyanites (Butler, 1871); C. divina (Weymer, 1911); C. francisca (Butler, 1870); C. glauca (Weymer, 1911); C. helena (Anken, 1994); C. helios (Weymer, 1911); C. lobelia (Butler, 1870); C. mare (Butler, 1869); C. maryzenderae Lamas & Nakahara, 2017; C. penicillata (Godman, 1905); C. pilata (Butler, 1867); C. romani (Aurivillius, 1929); C. saul Brévignon & Benmesbah, 2011; C. scopulata (Godman, 1905); C. scripta Nakahara, Zacca & Huertas, 2017; C. tenera (Weymer, 1911); C. thaliana Nakahara & Piovesan, 2022; C. trembathi Willmott, Nakahara, Hall & Neild, 2017; C. twalela (Brévignon, 2005); C. umbrosa (Butler, 1870); C. urania (Butler, 1867); C. ziza (Butler, 1869)	
Capronnieria Forster, 1964 Type species — Satyrus galesus Godart, [1824]	C. galesus (Godart, [1824]); C. narapa (Schaus, 1902)	
Carminda Ebert & Dias, 1998 Type species — Satyrus paeon Godart [1824]	C. griseldis (Weymer, 1911); C. paeon (Godart, [1824]); C. surpresa Barbosa, Aguiar, Rosa, Zacca & Freitas, 2020; C. umuarama (Ebert & Dias, 1997)	
Cepheuptychia Forster, 1964 Type species — Papilio cephus Fabricius, 1775	C. angelica (Butler, 1874); C. cephus (Fabricius, 1775); C. glaucina (Bates, 1864)	
Chloreuptychia Forster, 1964 Type species — Papilio chloris Cramer, 1778	C. agatha (Butler, 1867); C. amenthesysta Brévignon & Benmesbah, 2011; C. chlorimene (Hübner, [1819]); C. gordonsmalli Thurman, MacDonald & Nakahara, 2021	Chloreuptychia agatha
Cisandina Nakahara & Espeland, 2022 Type species —	C. castanya Lamas & Nakahara, 2022; C. esmeralda Nakahara & Barbosa, 2022; C. fida (Weymer, 1911); C. fida fida (Weymer, 1911); C. fida directa Nakahara & Willmott, 2022; C. lea (Cramer, 1777); C. philippa (Butler, 1867); C. sanmarcos (Nakahara & Lamas, 2018); C. trinitensis (Brévignon & Benmesbah, 2012)	
Cissia Doubleday, 1848 Type species — Papilio penelope Fabricius, 1775	C. anabelae (L.D. Miller, 1976); C. cheneyorum (Chermock, 1949); C. cleophes (Godman & Salvin, 1889); C. eous (Butler, 1867); C. penelope (Fabricius, 1775); C. phronius (Godart, [1824]); C. pompilia (C. Felder & R. Felder, 1867); C. proba (Butler, 1867); C. pseudocleophes (Miller, 1976); C. rubricata (Edwards, 1871); C. rubricata rubricata (Edwards, 1871); C. rubricata smithorum (Wind, 1946); C. wahala Grishin, 2022	Penelope's ringlet (Cissia penelope) Red Satyr (Cissia rubricata)
Colombeia Viloria, Andrade & Le Crom, 2019 Type species —	C. hotchkissi (Dyar, 1913); C. mycalesis (Röber, 1927); C. nossis (Hewitson, 1862)	
Cristalinaia Freitas, Barbosa & Zacca, 2019 Type species — Cristalinaia vitoria Mota, Zacca & Freitas, 2019	C. vitoria Mota, Zacca & Freitas, 2019	
Cyllopsis R. Felder, 1869 Type species — Neonympha hedemanni R. Felder, 1869	C. argentella (Butler & H. Druce, 1872); C. caballeroi (Beutelspacher, 1982); C. clinas (Godman & Salvin, 1889); C. diazi Miller, 1974; C. dospassosi Miller, 1974; C. emilia Chacón & Nishida, 2002; C. gemma (Hübner, 1808); C. gemma gemma (Hübner, 1808); C. gemma freemani (Stallings & Turner, 1947); C. guatemalena Miller, 1974; C. hedemanni R. Felder, 1869; C. hedemanni hedemanni R. Felder, 1869; C. hedemanni tamaulipensis Miller, 1974; C. hedemanni vetones (Godman & Salvin, 1878); C. hilaria (Godman, 1901); C. jacquelineae Miller, 1974; C. nayarit (Chermock, 1947); C. nelsoni (Godman & Salvin, 1881); C. pallens Miller, 1974; C. parvimaculata Miller, 1974; C. pephredo (Godman, 1901); C. perplexa Miller, 1974; C. perpepida (Dyar, 1912); C. pertepida perpepida (Dyar, 1912); C. pertepida avicula (Nabokov, 1942); C. pertepida intermedia Miller, 1974; C. pertepida maniola (Nabokov, 1942); C. philodice (Godman & Salvin, 1878); C. pseudopephredo (Chermock, 1947); C. pyracmon (Butler, 1867); C. pyracmon pyracmon (Butler, 1867); C. pyracmon henshawi (Edwards, 1876); C. rogersi (Godman & Salvin, 1878); C. schausi (Miller, 1974); C. steinhauserorum Miller, 1974; C. suivalenoides Miller, 1974; C. suivalens (Dyar, 1914); C. suivalens suivalens (Dyar, 1914); C. suivalens escalantei Miller, 1974; C. tomemmeli Warren & Nakahara, 2018; C. wellingi Miller, 1978; C. whiteorum Miller & de la Maza, 1984; C. windi Miller, 1974	Gemmed Satyr (Cyllopsis gemma) Nabokov's Satyr (Cyllopsis pyracmon)
Deltaya Willmott, Nakahara & Espeland, 2023 Type species — Papilio ocypete Fabricius, [1777]	D. andrei (Zacca, Casagrande & Mielke, 2017); D. louisammour (Benmesbah & Zacca, 2018); D. ocypete (Fabricius, 1776); D. opima (Weymer, 1911); D. pallema (Schaus, 1902); D. probata (Weymer, 1911)	
Emeryus Zacca, Casagrande & Mielke, 2020 Type species — Papilio ocypete Fabricius, [1777]	E. argulus (Godart, [1824]); E. argulus argulus (Godart, [1824]); E. argulus magnum Zacca, Casagrande & Mielke, 2020; E. difficilis (Forster, 1964); E. numeria (C. Felder & R. Felder, 1867)	
Erichthodes Forster, 1964 Type species — Neonympha antonina C. Felder & R. Felder, 1867	E. antonina (C. Felder & R. Felder, 1867); New genus required: E. eremita Lamas, Willmott & Radford, 2018; E. jovita C. Felder & R. Felder, 1867; E. julia (Weymer, 1911)	
Euptychia Hübner, 1818 Type species — Euptychia mollina Hübner, 1818	E. alacristata Neild, Nakahara & Fratello, 2014; E. aquila Fratello, Nakahara & Brévigon, 2015; E. atlantica Nakahara & Freitas, 2017; E. attenboroughi Neild, Nakahara, Fratello & Le Crom, 2015; E. audacia Brévignon, Fratello & Nakahara, 2015; E. boulleti (Le Cerf, 1919); E. cesarense Pulido, Andrade, Peña & Lamas, 2011; E. cesarense cesarense Pulido, Andrade, Peña & Lamas, 2011; E. cesarense obtusa Nakahara, 2015; E. cesarense viloriai Andrade, Pulido, Peña & Lamas, 2011; E. efraini Ríos, 2019; E. enyita Nakahara, Lamas & Willmott, 2015; E. enyo Butler, 1867; E. favonius Nakahara, Vega & Willmott, 2016; E. fernandae Nakahara & Willmott, 2015; E. fetna Butler, 1870; E. granatina Nakahara, Le Crom & Hall, 2015; E. hannemanni Forster, 1964; E. insolata Butler & H. Druce, 1872; E. jesia Butler, 1869; E. juanjoi Le Crom, Nakahara & Lamas, 2015; E. lacandona Warren & Nakahara, 2015; E. marceli Brévignon, 2005; E. marceli marceli Brévignon, 2005; E. marceli divisa Benmesbah, Costa, Attal & Viloria, 2021; E. meta Weymer, 1911; E. mollina Hübner, 1818; E. mollina mollina Hübner, 1818; E. mollina suzannae Brévignon, 2005; E. mollis Staudinger, 1876; E. neblina Warren & Nakahara, 2015; E. neildi Brévignon, 2005; E. padroni Nakahara, Lamas & Willmott, 2015; E. pegasus Nakahara & Hall, 2015; E. picea Butler, 1867; E. pillaca Nakahara & Willmott, 2015; E. roraima Nakahara, Fratello & Harvey, 2014; E. rubrofasciata Miller & Miller, 1988; E. rufocincta Weymer, 1911; E. sophiae Zacca, Nakahara, Dolibaina & Dias, 2015; E. truncata Nakahara & Hall, 2015; E. westwoodi Butler, 1867; E. westwoodi westwoodi Butler, 1867; E. westwoodi muli Brévignon, 2005; E. woroina Viloria & Benmesbah, 2020	Dorsal (left) and ventral (right) views of male Euptychia attenboroughi. Dorsal (left) and ventral (right) views of female Euptychia attenboroughi. Euptychia westwoodi
Euptychoides Forster, 1964 Type species — Euptychia saturnus Butler, 1867	E. albofasciata (Hewitson, 1869); E. laccine (C. Felder & R. Felder, 1867) [=E. saturnus (Butler, 1867)]; E. pseudosaturnus Forster, 1964	Euptychoides nossis
Forsterinaria Gray, 1973 Type species — Satyrus necys Godart, [1824]	F. anophthalma (C. Felder & R. Felder, 1867); F. antje Peña & Lamas, 2005; F. boliviana (Godman, 1905); F. chaniorum Viloria & Costa, 2019; F. coipa Peña & Lamas, 2005; F. difficilis (Forster, 1964); F. emo Zubek, Pyrcz & Boyer, 2014; F. enjuerma Peña & Lamas, 2005; F. falcata Peña & Lamas, 2005; F. guaniloi Peña & Lamas, 2005; F. hannieri Zubek & Pyrcz, 2011; F. inornata (C. Felder & R. Felder, 1867); F. inornata inornata (C. Felder & R. Felder, 1867); F. inornata magdalena (Hayward, 1957); F. itatiaia Peña & Lamas, 2005; F. necys (Godart, [1824]); F. neonympha (C. Felder & R. Felder, 1867); F. pallida Peña & Lamas, 2005; F. pallida pallida Peña & Lamas, 2005; F. pallida aurita Peña & Lamas, 2005; F. pichita Peña & Lamas, 2005; F. pilosa Peña & Lamas, 2005; F. pronophila (Butler, 1867); F. proxima (Hayward, 1957); F. pseudinornata (Forster, 1964); F. punctata Peña & Lamas, 2005; F. pseudonecys (Strand, 1916); F. pyrczi Peña & Lamas, 2005; F. quantius (Godart, [1824]); F. rotunda Peña & Lamas, 2005; F. rustica (Butler, 1868); F. rustica rustica (Butler, 1868); F. rustica villarresi (Dognin, 1887); F. stella (Hayward, 1957)	Forsterinaria pallida aurita
Godartiana Forster, 1964 Type species — Satyrus byses Godart, [1824]	G. amadoi Paluch, Zacca & Freitas, 2016; G. armilla (Butler, 1867); G. astronesthes Lamas & Nakahara, 2018; G. byses (Godart, [1824]); G. luederwaldti (Spitz, 1931); G. muscosa (Butler, 1870)	
Graphita Nakahara, Marín & Barbosa, 2016 Type species — Neonympha griphe C. Felder & R. Felder, 1867	G. griphe (C. Felder & R. Felder, 1867)	
Harjesia Forster, 1964 Type species — Taygetis blanda Möschler, 1877	H. argentata Nakahara, Zacca & Lamas, 2018; H. blanda (Möschler, 1877); H. obscura (Butler, 1867)	
Hermeuptychia Forster, 1964 Type species — Papilio hermes Fabricius, 1775	H. atalanta (Butler, 1867); H. canthe (Hübner, [1811]); H. clara Nakahara, Tan, Lamas & Willmott, 2016; H. cucullina (Weymer, 1911); H. fallax (C. Felder & R. Felder, 1867); H. fallax fallax (C. Felder & R. Felder, 1867); H. fallax marinha Anken, 1994; H. gisella (Hayward, 1957); H. harmonia (Butler, 1867); H. hermes (Fabricius, 1775); H. camerta (Cramer, 1780); H. hermybius Grishin, 2014; H. intricata Grishin, 2014; H. lupita (Reakirt [1867]); H. maimoune (Butler, 1870); H. occidentalis Grishin, 2021; H. pimpla (C. Felder & R. Felder, 1867); H. sinuosa Grishin, 2021; H. sosybius (Fabricius, 1793); P. undulata (Butler, 1867)	Hermes satyr (Euptychia hermes) Carolina Satyr (Hermeuptychia sosybius)
Huberonympha Viloria & Costa, 2016 Type species — Huberonympha neildi Viloria, Costa, Fratello & Nakahara, 2016	H. neildi Viloria, Costa, Fratello & Nakahara, 2016	
Inbio Nakahara & Espeland, 2015 Type species — Neonympha hilara C. Felder & R. Felder, 1867	I. hilara (C. Felder & R. Felder, 1867)	
Koutalina Viloria & Murienne, 2021 Type species —	K. pamela (Hayward, 1957)	
Lazulina Willmott, Nakahara & Espeland, 2023 Type species — Euptychia hewitsonii Butler, 1867	L. catharina (Staudinger, [1886]); L. hewitsonii (Butler, 1867); L. tolumnia (Cramer, 1777)	Lazulina hewitsonii
Llorenteana Viloria & Luis-Martínez, 2019 Type species — Llorenteana pellonia (Godman, 1901)	Llorenteana pellonia (Godman, 1901)	
Magneuptychia Forster, 1964 Type species — Papilio libye Linnaeus, 1767	M. inani (Staudinger, [1886]); M. lethra (Möschler, 1883); M. libye (Linnaeus, 1767)	
Malaveria Viloria & Benmesbah, 2021 Type species —	M. affinis (Butler, 1867); M. alcinoe (C. Felder & R. Felder, 1867); M. argyrospila (Butler, 1867); M. ballofi Benmesbah & Viloria, 2021; M. bottoi Benmesbah & Viloria, 2021; M. duponti Benmesbah & Murienne, 2021; M. erigone (Butler, 1867); M. grimon (Godart, [1824]); M. guenzeli (Anken, 1994); M. iseai (Viloria, 2022); M. maepius (Godart, [1824]); M. mimas (Godman, 1905); M. mimula (Hayward, 1954); M. mythra (Weymer, 1911); M. nebulosa (Butler, 1867); M. neomaenas (Hayward, 1967); M. rodriguezi Benmesbah & Viloria, 2021; M. rodriguezi rodriguezi Benmesbah & Viloria, 2021; M. rodriguezi risaralda Benmesbah & Viloria, 2021	Alcinoe satyr (Malaveria alcinoe). Dorsal view on left, ventral view on right) Malaveria nebulosa
Megeuptychia Forster, 1964 Type species — Papilio antonoe Cramer, 1775	M. antonoe (Cramer, 1775); M. monopunctata Willmott & Hall, 1995; M. souadae Benmesbah, 2015	Megeuptychia antonoe
Megisto Hübner, [1819] Type species — Papilio cymela Cramer, 1777	M. cymela (Cramer, 1777); M. cymela cymela (Cramer, 1777); M. cymela viola (Maynard, 1891); M. opalina (Butler, 1871); M. opalina opalina (Butler, 1871); M. opalina macrophthalmia Fruhstorfer, 1911; M. opalina bailiensis Yoshino, 2001	Little Wood Satyr (Megisto cymela)
Modestia Viloria & Benmesbah, 2021 Type species —	M. agnata (Schaus, 1913); M. analis (Godman, 1905); M. drymo (Schaus, 1913); M. gomezi (Singer, DeVries & Ehrlich, 1983); M. harpyia (C. Felder & R. Felder, 1867); M. harpyia harpyia (C. Felder & R. Felder, 1867); M. harpyia batesii (Butler, 1867); M. modesta (Butler, 1867); M. remypignoux Benmesbah & Viloria, 2021; M. remypignoux Benmesbah & Viloria, 2021; M. remypignoux shueyi Benmesbah & Viloria, 2021; M. sylvina (C. Felder & R. Felder, 1867)	
Modica Zacca, Casagrande & Willmott, 2023 Type species — Euptychia confusa Staudinger, 1887	M. confusa (Staudinger, 1887); M. fugitiva (Lamas, [1997]); M. kamel (Benmesbah & Zacca, 2018); M. maripa (Brévignon, 2005); M. myncea (Cramer, 1780)	Magneuptychia fugitiva
Moneuptychia Forster, 1964 Type species — Euptychia soter Butler, 1877	M. castrensis (Schaus, 1902); M. giffordi Freitas, Emery & Mielke, 2010; M. itapeva Freitas, 2007; M. melchiades (Butler, 1877); M. montana Freitas, 2015; M. pervagata Freitas, Siewert & Mielke, 2015; M. romanina (Bryk, 1953); M. soter (Butler, 1877); M. vitellina Freitas & Barbosa, 2015; M. viviana (Romieux, 1927); M. wahlbergi Freitas, Barbosa, Siewert & Mielke, 2015	
Neonympha Hübner, 1818 Type species — Papilio areolatus Smith, 1797	N. areolatus (Smith, 1797); N. helicta (Hübner, [1808]); N. helicta helicta (Hübner, [1808]); N. helicta dadeensis Gatrelle, 1999; N. helicta septentrionalis Davis, 1924; N. mitchellii French, 1889; N. mitchellii mitchellii French, 1889; N. mitchellii francisci Parshall & Kral, 1989	Mitchell's Satyr butterfly (Neonympha mitchellii)
Nhambikuara Freitas, Barbosa & Zacca, 2018 Type species — Nhambikuara cerradensis Freitas, Barbosa & Zacca, 2018	N. ackeryi (Huertas, Ríos & Le Crom, 2009) (Magdalena Valley ringlet); N. cerradensis Freitas, Barbosa & Zacca, 2018; N. doxes (Godart, [1824]); N. erycina (Butler, 1867); N. furina (Hewitson, 1862); N. gemmula (Butler, 1867); N. junonia (Butler, 1867); N. latia (Butler, 1867); N. mercedes (Huertas, 2011); N. mima (Butler, 1867); N. toynei (Willmott & Hall, 1995)	
Occulta Nakahara & Willmott, 2023 Type species — Euptychia ocnus Butler, 1867	O. ocnus (Butler, 1867)	
Omacha Andrade, Viloria, Henao & Le Crom, 2019	O. pax (Huertas, Lamas, Fagua & Willmott, 2016)	
Optimandes Marín, Nakahara & Willmott, 2019 Type species —	O. eugenia (C. Felder & R. Felder, 1867); O. eugenia eugenia (C. Felder & R. Felder, 1867); O. eugenia transversa (Weymer, 1911); O. mocha Willmott, J. Hall & Lamas, 2019	
Orotaygetis Nakahara & Zacca, 2018 Type species — Orotaygetis surui Nakahara, Zacca & Lamas, 2018	O. surui Nakahara, Zacca & Lamas, 2018	
Paleonympha Butler, 1871 Type species — Paleonympha opalina Butler, 1871	P. opalina Butler, 1871|	Palaeonympha opalina
Paramacera Butler, 1868 Type species — Neonympha xicaque Reakirt, [1867]	P. allyni Miller, 1972; P. chinanteca Miller, 1972; P. copiosa Miller, 1972; P. xicaque (Reakirt, [1867]); P. rubrosuffusa Miller, 1972	Pine Satyr (Paramacera allyni)
Parataygetis Forster, 1964 Type species — Euptychia albinota Butler, 1867	P. albinotata (Butler, 1867); P. lineata (Godman & Salvin, 1880)	
Pareuptychia Forster, 1964 Type species — Pareuptychia hesionides Forster, 1964	P. binocula (Butler, 1869); P. difficilis (Forster, 1964); P. hervei Brévignon, 2005; P. hesionides Forster, 1964; P. hesionides hesioniades Forster, 1964; P. hesionides deviae Brévignon, 2005; P. lydia (Cramer, 1777); P. metaleuca (Boisduval, 1870); P. milleri Nakahara, Marín & Neild, 2016; P. ocirrhoe (Fabricius, 1776); P. ocirrhoe ocirrhoe (Fabricius, 1776); P. ocirrhoe interjecta (d'Almeida, 1952); P. summandosa (Gosse, 1880)|	White satyr (Pareuptychia ocirrhoe)
Paryphthimoides Forster, 1964 Type species — Neonympha polytis Prittwitz, 1865	P. brixiola (Butler, 1867); P. brixius (Godart, [1824]); P. brixius brixius (Godart, [1824]); P. brixius madre Zacca, Mielke, Casagrande & Lamas, 2020; P. brixius rouranensis Brévignon, 2020; P. flavofascia (Zacca & Siewert, 2014); P. fridae Zacca, Casagrande, Huertas & Nakahara, 2020; P. jorupe Zacca, Casagrande, Checa & Willmott, 2020; P. joyceae (Singer, DeVries & Ehrlich, 1983); P. poltys (Prittwitz, 1865); P. poltys poltys (Prittwitz, 1865); P. poltys numilia (C. Felder & R. Felder, 1867); P. pseudoconfusa (Singer, DeVries & Ehrlich, 1983); P. sheba (Brévignon & Benmesbah, 2012); P. terrestris (Butler, 1867); P. terrestris terrestris (Butler, 1867); P. terrestris araguaianus Zacca, Casagrande & Mielke, 2020; P. terrestris grevei Zacca, Casagrande & Mielke, 2020; P. terrestris muyrakytan Zacca, Casagrande & Mielke, 2020; P. touloulou (Benmesbah, 2015); P. vestigiata (Butler, 1867)	
Pharneuptychia Forster, 1964 Type species — Satyrus phares Godart, [1824]	P. estoraquensis Henao & Meneses, 2017; P. haywardiana Lamas, 2010; P. phares (Godart, [1824])*; P. pharnabazos (Bryk, 1953); P. pharnaces (Weymer, 1911); In need of new genus: P. innocentia (C. Felder & R. Felder, 1867)	
Pindis R. Felder, 1869 Type species — Pindis squamistriga R. Felder, 1869	P. squamistriga R. Felder, 1869	
Posttaygetis Forster, 1964 Type species — Papilio penelea Cramer, 1777	P. penelea (Cramer, 1777)	Posttaygetis penelea
Prenda Freitas & Mielke, 2011 Type species — Prenda clarissa Freitas & Mielke, 2011	P. clarissa Freitas & Mielke, 2011	
Pseudeuptychia Forster, 1964 Type species — Euptychia languida Butler, 1867	P. callichloris (Butler, 1867); P. cuzquenya Nakahara & Lamas, 2018; P. hemileuca (Staudinger, [1886]); C. herseis (Godart, [1824]); P. languida (Butler, 1867); P. languida languida (Butler, 1867); P. languida austrina Nakahara & Lamas, 2018; P. marica (Weymer, 1911); P. rectilinea (Brévignon, Rosant, Lamas & Willmott, 2019)	Chloreuptychia herseis
Pseudodebis Forster, 1964 Type species — Papilio valentina Cramer, 1779	P. celia (Cramer, 1779); P. darrenthroopi Nakahara & Willmott, 2022; P. dubiosa Forster, 1964; P. euptychidia (Butler, 1868); P. hartmanni Nakahara & MacDonald, 2021; P. marpessa (Hewitson, 1862); P. nakamurai Nakahara & Willmott, 2021; P. pieti Nakahara & Willmott, 2021; P. puritana (Weeks, 1902); P. tigrillo Nakahara & Willmott, 2022; P. valentina (Cramer, 1779); P. vrazi (Kheil, 1896); P. zimri (Butler, 1869)	Pseudodebis valentina
Rareuptychia Forster, 1964 Type species — Euptychia clio Weymer, 1911	R. clio (Weymer, 1911)	
Satyrotaygetis Forster, 1964 Type species — Taygetis satyrina Bates, 1865	S. iris (C. Felder & R. Felder, 1867); S. satyrina (Bates, 1865) (Wide-bordered satyr); S. tiessa (Hewitson, 1869)	Wide-bordered satyr (Satyrotaygetis satyrina)
Saurona Huertas & Willmott, 2023 Type species — Euptychia aurigera var. triangula Aurivillius, 1929,	S. aurigera (Weymer, 1911); S. triangula (Aurivillius, 1929)	
Scriptor Nakhara & Espeland, 2020 Type species —	S. sphenophorus Lamas & Nakahara, 2020	
Sepona Freitas & Barbosa, 2016 Type species — Euptychia punctata Weymer, 1911	S. punctata (Weymer, 1911)	
Splendeuptychia Forster, 1964 Type species — Euptychia ashna Hewitson, 1869	S. ambra (Weymer, [1911]); S. ashna (Hewitson, 1869); S. gera (Hewitson, 1850); S. metagera (Butler, 1867); S. moderata (Weymer, 1911); S nortia (Hewitson, 1862); S. purusana (Aurivillius, 1929); S. segesta (Weymer, 1911); S. tupinamba (Freitas, Huertas & Rosa, 2021)	
Stegosatyrus Zacca, Mielke & Pyrcz, 2013 Type species — Satyrus periphas Godart, [1824]	S. hemiclara Pyrcz, Boyer & Zacca, 2013; S. imbrialis (Weeks, 1901); S. ocelloides (Schaus, 1902); S. periphas (Godart, [1824])	
Stephenympha Viloria, 2022 Type species —	S. arius (Weymer, 1911); S. eriphule (Butler, 1867); S. pauliana Viloria, 2022	
Stevenaria Viloria, Costa, Neild & Nakahara, 2016 Type species — Stevenaria yutajensis Viloria & Costa, 2016	S. divergens (Butler, 1867); S. nakaharai Viloria, Costa, Fratello & Neild, 2016; S. yutajensis Viloria & Costa, 2016	
Taguaiba Freitas, Zacca & Siewert, 2023 Type species — Taygetis drogoni Siewert, Zacca et al., 2013	T. drogoni (Siewert, Zacca, Dias & Freitas, 2013); T. fulginia (d'Almeida, 1922); T. rectifascia (Weymer, 1907); T. servius (Weymer, 1919); T. ypthima (Hübner, [1821])	Taygetis drogoni, a dorsal, b ventral.jpg
Taydebis Freitas, 2003 Type species — Euptychia peculiaris Butler, 1874	T. clarissa (Freitas & Mielke, 2011); T. guria Zacca, Casagrande & Mielke, 2021; T. melobosis (Capronnier, 1874) [=T. peculiaris Butler, 1874]	
Taygetina Forster, 1964 Type species — Taygetis banghaasi Weymer, 1910	T. accacioi Nakahara & Freitas, 2019; T. banghaasi (Weymer, 1910); T. brocki Lamas & Nakahara, 2019; T. gulnare (Butler, 1870); T. kerea (Butler, 1869); T. oreba (Butler, 1870); T. peribaea (Godman & Salvin, 1880); T. weymeri (Draudt, 1912)	
Taygetis Hübner, [1819] Type species — Papilio mermera Cramer, 1776	T. acuta Weymer, 1910; T. angulosa Weymer, 1907; T. asterie Weymer, 1910; T. chiquitana Forster, 1964; T. chrysogone Doubleday, [1849]; T. cleopatra C. Felder & R. Felder, 1867; T. echo (Cramer, 1775); T. elegia Weymer, 1910; T. inambari Miller & Lamas, 1999; T. inconspicua Draudt, 1931; T. kharisma Brévigon & Benmesbah, 2011; T. laches (Fabricius, 1793); T. laches laches (Fabricius, 1793); T. laches marginata Staudinger, [1887]; T. larua C. Felder & R. Felder, 1867; T. leuctra Butler, 1870; T. mermeria (Cramer, 1776); T. mermeria mermeria (Cramer, 1776); T. mermeria excavata Butler, 1868; T. mermeria griseomarginata L.D. Miller, 1978; T. oyapock Brévignon, 2007; T. rufomarginata Staudinger, 1888; T. rufomarginata rufomarginata Staudinger, 1888; T. rufomarginata tapulunmi Brévignon, 2005; T. sosis Hopffer, 1874; T. sylvia Bates, 1866; T. thamyra (Cramer, 1779); T. tripunctata Weymer, 1907; T. uncinata Weymer, 1907; T. uzza Butler, 1869; T. virgilia (Cramer, 1776); T. zippora Butler, 1869	Taygetis laches, dorsal view. Taygetis laches, ventral view.
Trico Nakahara & Espeland, 2023 Type species — Euptychia tricolor' Hewitson, 1850	T. tricolor (Hewitson, 1850); T. tricolor tricolor (Hewitson, 1850); T. tricolor fulgora (Butler, 1869)	
Vanima Zacca, Casagrande & Mielke, 2020 Type species —	V. labe (Butler, 1870); V. lesbia (Staudinger, [1886]); V. palladia (Butler, 1867)	
Vareuptychia Forster, 1964 Type species —	V. similis (Butler, 1867); V. themis (Butler, 1870)	
Xenovena Marín & Nakahara, 2023 Type species — Magneuptychia murrayae Brévignon, 2005	X. murrayae (Brévignon, 2005)	
Yphthimoides Forster, 1964 Type species — Neonympha yphthima C. Felder & R. Felder, 1867	Y. acmenis (Hübner, 1823); Y. angularis (Butler, 1867); Y. bella Barbosa & Freitas, 2015; Y. blanquita Barbosa, Marín & Freitas, 2017; Y. borasta (Schaus, 1902); Y. celmis (Godart, [1824]); Y. cipoensis Freitas, 2004; Y. gabriela Barbosa, Freitas & Paluch, 2015; Y. inornata (Hayward, 1962); Y. iserhardi Freitas & Barbosa, 2015; Y. kinyoni Lamas, Nakahara & Barbosa, 2021; Y. leguialimai (Dyar, 1913); Y. manasses (C. Felder & R. Felder, 1867); Y. nareta Barbosa & Freitas, 2017; Y. ochracea (Butler, 1867); Y. ordinaria Freitas, Kaminski & Mielke, 2012; Y. pacta (Weymer, 1911); Y. patricia (Hayward, 1957); Y. renata (Stoll, 1780); Y. straminea (Butler, 1867); Y. yphthima (C. Felder & R. Felder, 1867)	
Zischkaia Forster, 1964 Type species — Euptychia amalda Weymer, 1911	Z. abanico Nakahara & Petit, 2019; Z. amalda (Weymer, 1911); Z. arctoa Nakahara, 2019; Z. arenisca Nakahara, Willmott & J. Hall, 2019; Z. argyrosflecha Nakahara, L.D. Miller & Huertas, 2019; Z. baku Zacca, Dolibaina & Dias, 2019; Z. chullachaki Nakahara & Zacca, 2019; Z. josti Nakahara & Kleckner, 2019; Z. mielkeorum Dolibaina, Dias & Zacca, 2019; Z. pacarus (Godart, [1824]); Z. saundersii (Butler, 1867); Z. warreni Dias, Zacca & Dolibaina, 2019	
Incertae sedis	Species in need of new genus assignment: Euptychia insignis (Butler, 1867); Euptychia ordinata (Weymer, 1911); Pharneuptychia innocentia (C. Felder & R. Felder, 1867); Erichthodes eremita Lamas, Willmott & Radford, 2018; Erichthodes jovita C. Felder & R. Felder, 1867; Erichthodes julia (Weymer, 1911)	
