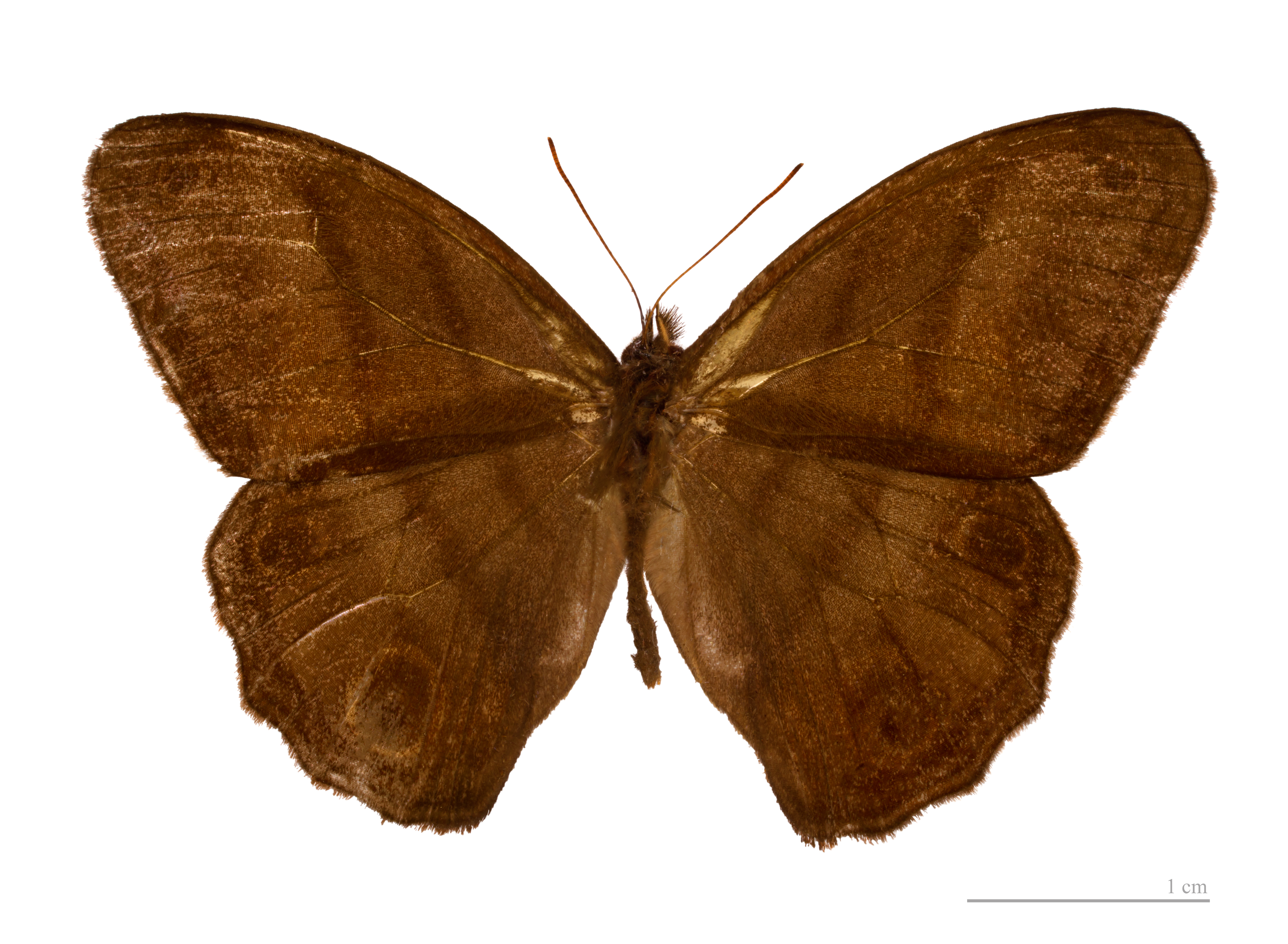
- Magneuptychia harpyia

Scientific classification
- Kingdom: Animalia
- Phylum: Arthropoda
- Class: Insecta
- Order: Lepidoptera
- Family: Nymphalidae
- Subfamily: Satyrinae
- Tribe: Satyrini
- Subtribe: Euptychiina
- Genus: Magneuptychia; Forster, 1964

= Magneuptychia =

Genus of butterflies

Magneuptychia is a genus of satyrid butterflies found in the Neotropical realm.

== Species ==
Listed alphabetically.

- Magneuptychia libye (Linnaeus, 1767)
- Magneuptychia lethra (Möschler, 1883) (inc. **Magneuptychia newtoni (Hall, 1939))

Others to find source of transfers:

- Magneuptychia alcinoe (C. & R. Felder, 1867)
- Magneuptychia francisca (Butler, 1870)
- Magneuptychia gera (Hewitson, 1850)
- Magneuptychia gomezi (Singer, DeVries & Ehrlich, 1983)
- Magneuptychia inani (Staudinger, [1886])
- Magneuptychia iris (C. & R. Felder, 1867)
- Magneuptychia metagera (Butler, 1867)
- Magneuptychia mimas (Godman, 1905)
- Magneuptychia moderata (Weymer, 1911)
- Magneuptychia mycalesis (Röber, 1927)
- Magneuptychia nebulosa (Butler, 1867)
- Magneuptychia pax (Huertas et al., 2016)
- Magneuptychia probata (Weymer, 1911)
- Magneuptychia segesta (Weymer, 1911)
- Magneuptychia tiessa (Hewitson, 1869)

Taxa moved to other genera in 2023 or recently before:

Cisandina

- Magneuptychia lea (Cramer, [1780])

Deltaya

- Magneuptychia andrei (Zacca, Casagrande & O. Mielke, 2017) [was missing]
- Magneuptychia louisammour Benmesbah & Zacca, 2018 [was missing]
- Magneuptychia ocypete (Fabricius, 1776) [=sabina, olivacea]
- Magneuptychia opima (Weymer, 1911)
- Magneuptychia pallema (Schaus, 1902)

Modestia

- Magneuptychia agnata (Schaus, 1913)
- Magneuptychia analis (Godman, 1905)
- Magneuptychia drymo (Schaus, 1913)
- Magneuptychia harpyia (C. & R. Felder, 1867)
- Magneuptychia modesta (Butler, 1867)

Modica

- Magneuptychia fugitiva Lamas, [1997]
- Magneuptychia kamel Benmesbah & Zacca, 2018 [was missing]

Occulta

- Magneuptychia ocnus (Butler, 1867)

Stevenaria

- Magneuptychia divergens (Butler, 1867)

Trico

- Magneuptychia tricolor (Hewitson, 1850)

Xenovena

- Magneuptychia murrayae Brévignon, 2005
