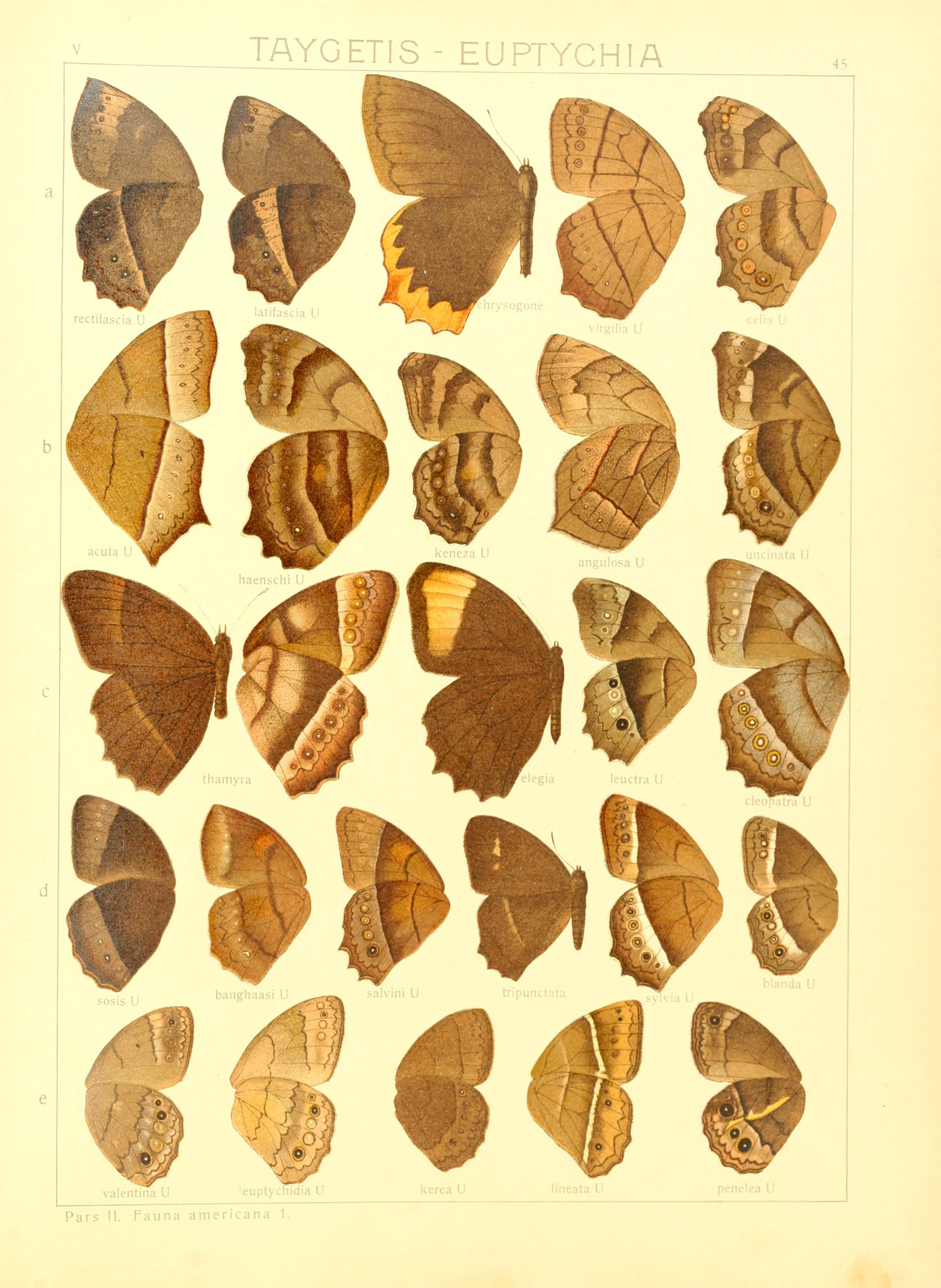
- Second from the left, line "d"

Scientific classification
- Kingdom: Animalia
- Phylum: Arthropoda
- Class: Insecta
- Order: Lepidoptera
- Family: Nymphalidae
- Subfamily: Satyrinae
- Tribe: Satyrini
- Subtribe: Euptychiina
- Genus: Taygetina; Forster, 1964
- Species: T. banghaasi

Binomial name
- Taygetina banghaasi (Weymer, 1910)

= Taygetina =

Genus of butterflies

Taygetina is a monotypic butterfly genus of the subfamily Satyrinae in the family Nymphalidae. The species in Coeruleotaygetis have been included in Taygetina. Its one species, Taygetina banghaasi, is found in the Neotropical realm.
