= Rareuptychia =

Scientific classification
- Kingdom: Animalia
- Phylum: Arthropoda
- Clade: Pancrustacea
- Class: Insecta
- Order: Lepidoptera
- Family: Nymphalidae
- Subfamily: Satyrinae
- Tribe: Satyrini
- Subtribe: Euptychiina
- Genus: Rareuptychia; Forster, 1964
- Species: R. clio

Binomial name
- Rareuptychia clio (Weymer, 1911)

Genus of butterflies

Rareuptychia is a monotypic butterfly genus of the subfamily Satyrinae in the family Nymphalidae. Its one species, Rareuptychia clio, is found in the Neotropical realm.
