= Saurona =

Scientific classification
- Kingdom: Animalia
- Phylum: Arthropoda
- Clade: Pancrustacea
- Class: Insecta
- Order: Lepidoptera
- Family: Nymphalidae
- Subfamily: Satyrinae
- Tribe: Satyrini
- Subtribe: Euptychiina
- Genus: Saurona; Huertas & Willmott, 2023

Type species
- Euptychia aurigera var triangula Aurivillius, 1929

Genus of insects

Saurona is a genus of butterfly belonging to the family Nymphalidae found in the Neotropics. This genus was proposed as a new genus in 2023.

== Species ==
Saurona currently has two species classified within it but there are thought to be many more undescribed species.

- Saurona aurigera (Weymer, 1911)
- Saurina triangula (Aurivillius, 1929)

== Etymology ==
Saurona is named after the fictional Sauron, the villain from Lord of the Rings by J. R. R. Tolkien. Tolkien described Sauron's all-seeing eye as follows: “The Eye was rimmed with fire, but was itself glazed, yellow as a cat’s, watchful and intent, and the black slit of its pupil opened on a pit, a window into nothing.” These butterflies have distinctive eyespots of bright orange and black.
