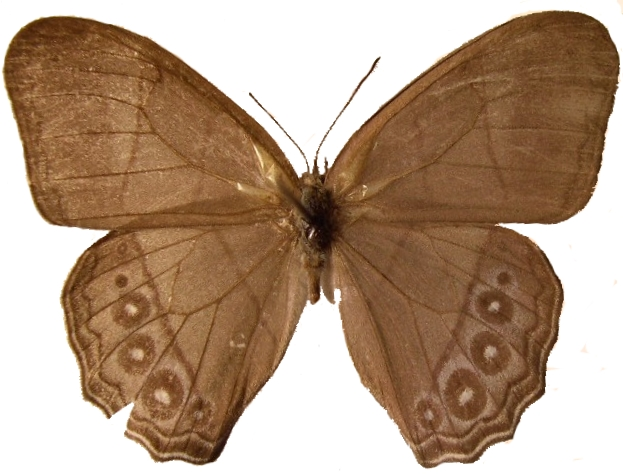

Scientific classification
- Kingdom: Animalia
- Phylum: Arthropoda
- Class: Insecta
- Order: Lepidoptera
- Family: Nymphalidae
- Subfamily: Satyrinae
- Tribe: Satyrini
- Subtribe: Euptychiina
- Genus: Archeuptychia; Forster, 1964
- Species: A. cluena

Binomial name
- Archeuptychia cluena (Drury, 1782)

= Archeuptychia =

Genus of butterflies

Archeuptychia is a monotypic satyrid butterfly genus described by Walter Forster in 1964. Its sole member, Archeuptychia cluena is found in Brazil. The original name of this species was Papilio cluena as described by Dru Drury in 1782.
