= Capronnieria =

Scientific classification
- Kingdom: Animalia
- Phylum: Arthropoda
- Class: Insecta
- Order: Lepidoptera
- Family: Nymphalidae
- Subfamily: Satyrinae
- Tribe: Satyrini
- Subtribe: Euptychiina
- Genus: Capronnieria; Forster, 1964
- Species: C. galesus

Binomial name
- Capronnieria galesus (Godart, [1824])

Genus of butterflies

Capronnieria is a monotypic butterfly genus of the subfamily Satyrinae found in the Neotropical realm. Its one species is Capronnieria galesus described by Jean Baptiste Godart in 1824.
