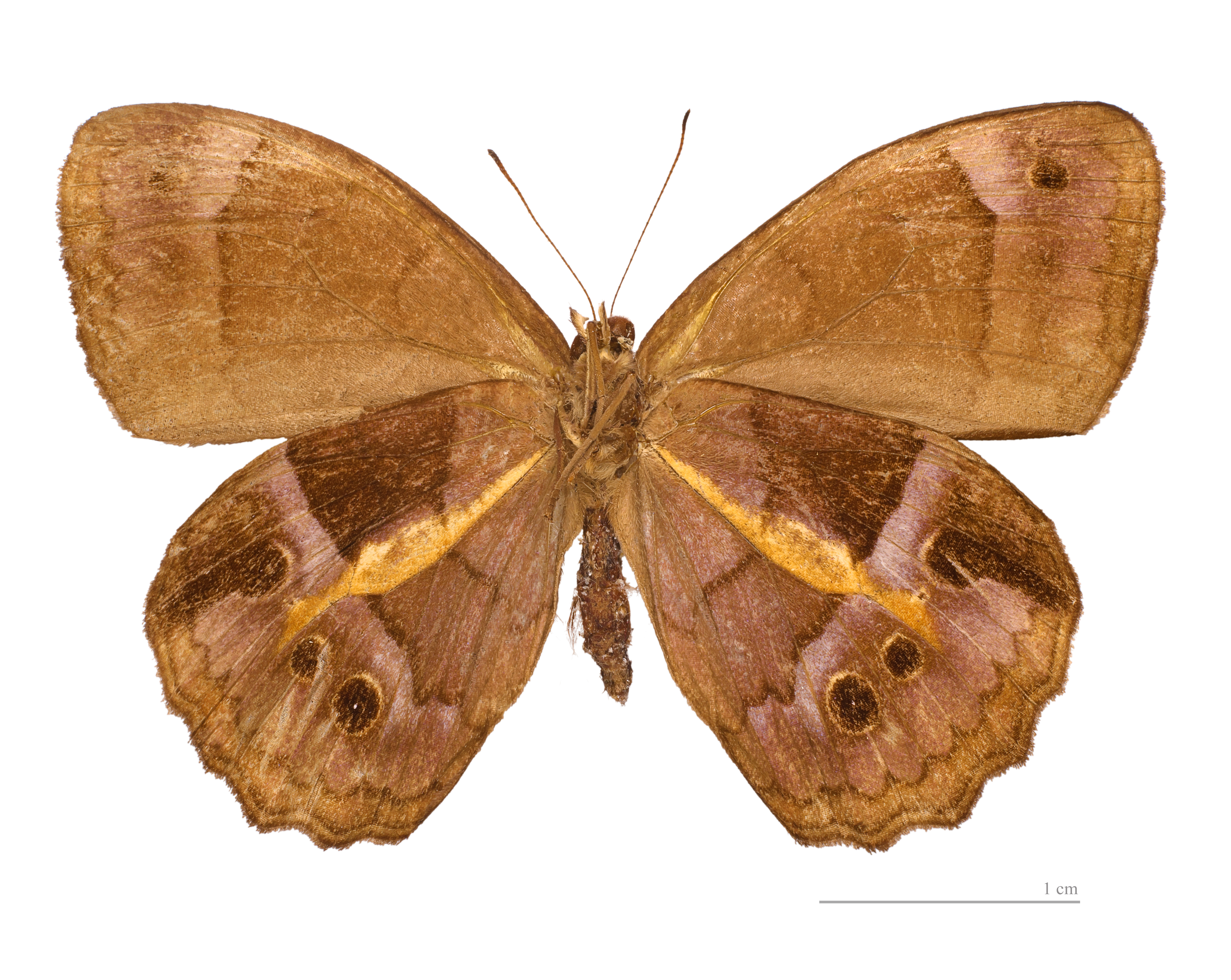

Scientific classification
- Kingdom: Animalia
- Phylum: Arthropoda
- Class: Insecta
- Order: Lepidoptera
- Family: Nymphalidae
- Tribe: Satyrini
- Subtribe: Euptychiina
- Genus: Posttaygetis; Forster, 1964
- Species: P. penelea

Binomial name
- Posttaygetis penelea (Cramer, [1777])

= Posttaygetis =

Genus of butterflies

Posttaygetis is a monotypic butterfly genus of the subfamily Satyrinae in the family Nymphalidae. Its one species is Posttaygetis penelea, which is found in the Neotropical realm.
