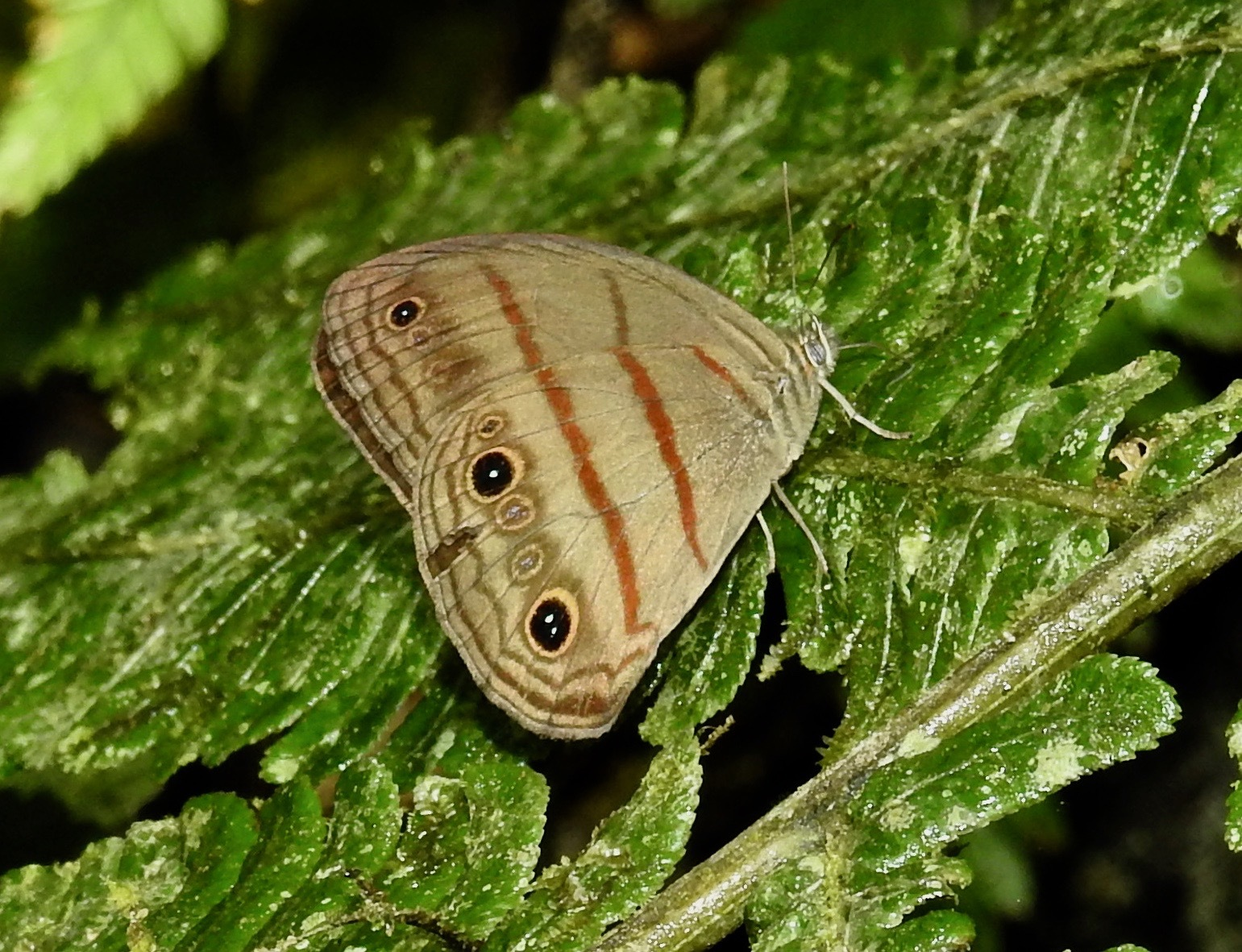

Scientific classification
- Kingdom: Animalia
- Phylum: Arthropoda
- Class: Insecta
- Order: Lepidoptera
- Family: Nymphalidae
- Subfamily: Satyrinae
- Tribe: Satyrini
- Subtribe: Euptychiina
- Genus: Megeuptychia; Forster, 1964

= Megeuptychia =

Genus of butterflies

Megeuptychia is a genus of satyrid butterflies found in the Neotropical realm.

== Species ==
Listed alphabetically:

- Megeuptychia antonoe (Cramer, [1775])
- Megeuptychia monopunctata Willmott & Hall, 1995
