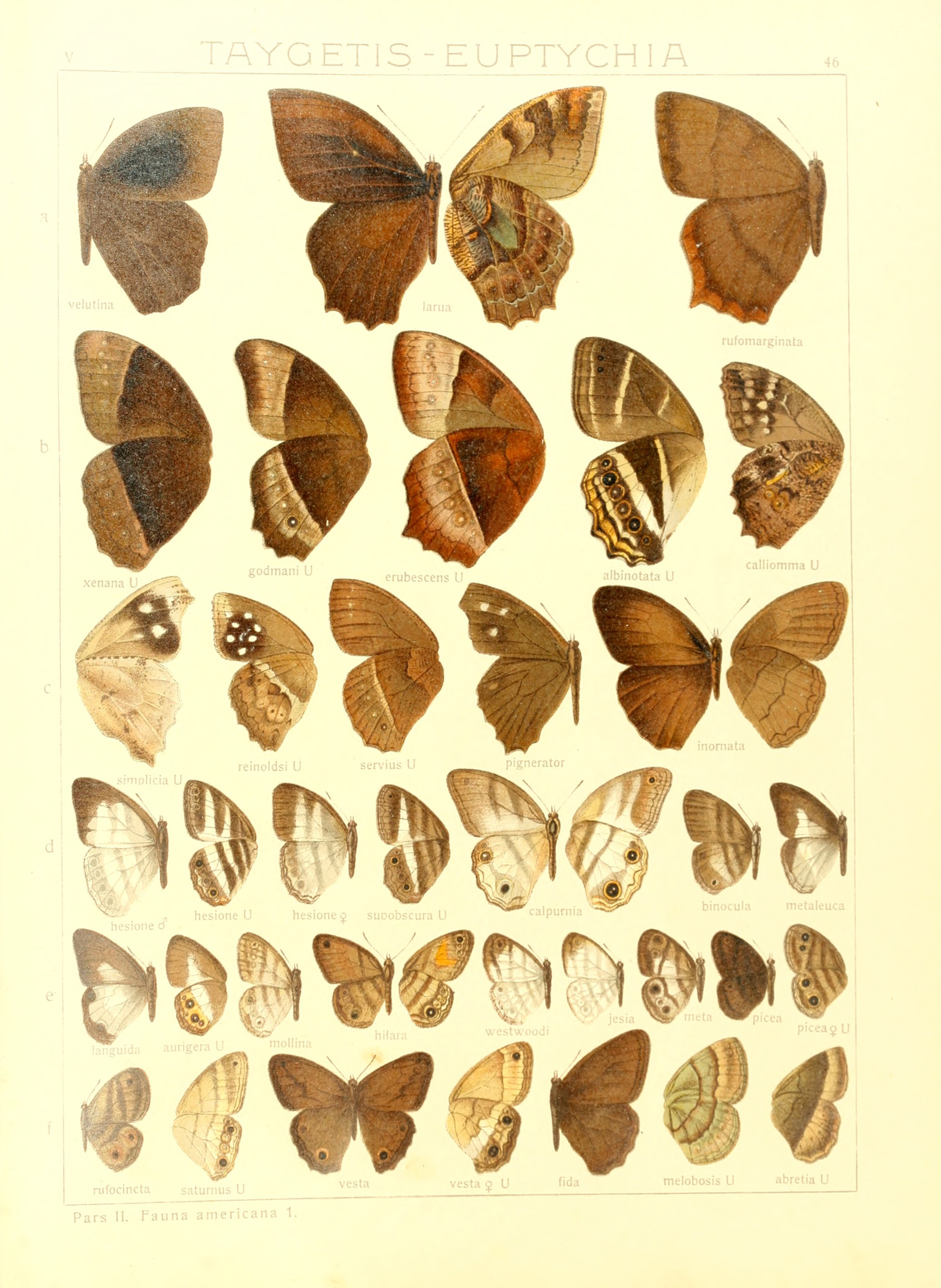
- e

Scientific classification
- Kingdom: Animalia
- Phylum: Arthropoda
- Class: Insecta
- Order: Lepidoptera
- Family: Nymphalidae
- Subfamily: Satyrinae
- Tribe: Satyrini
- Subtribe: Euptychiina
- Genus: Pseudeuptychia; Forster, 1964

= Pseudeuptychia =

Genus of butterflies

Pseudeuptychia is a genus of satyrid butterflies found in the Neotropical realm.

== Species ==
Listed alphabetically:

- Pseudeuptychia hemileuca (Staudinger, [1886])
- Pseudeuptychia languida (Butler, 1871)
