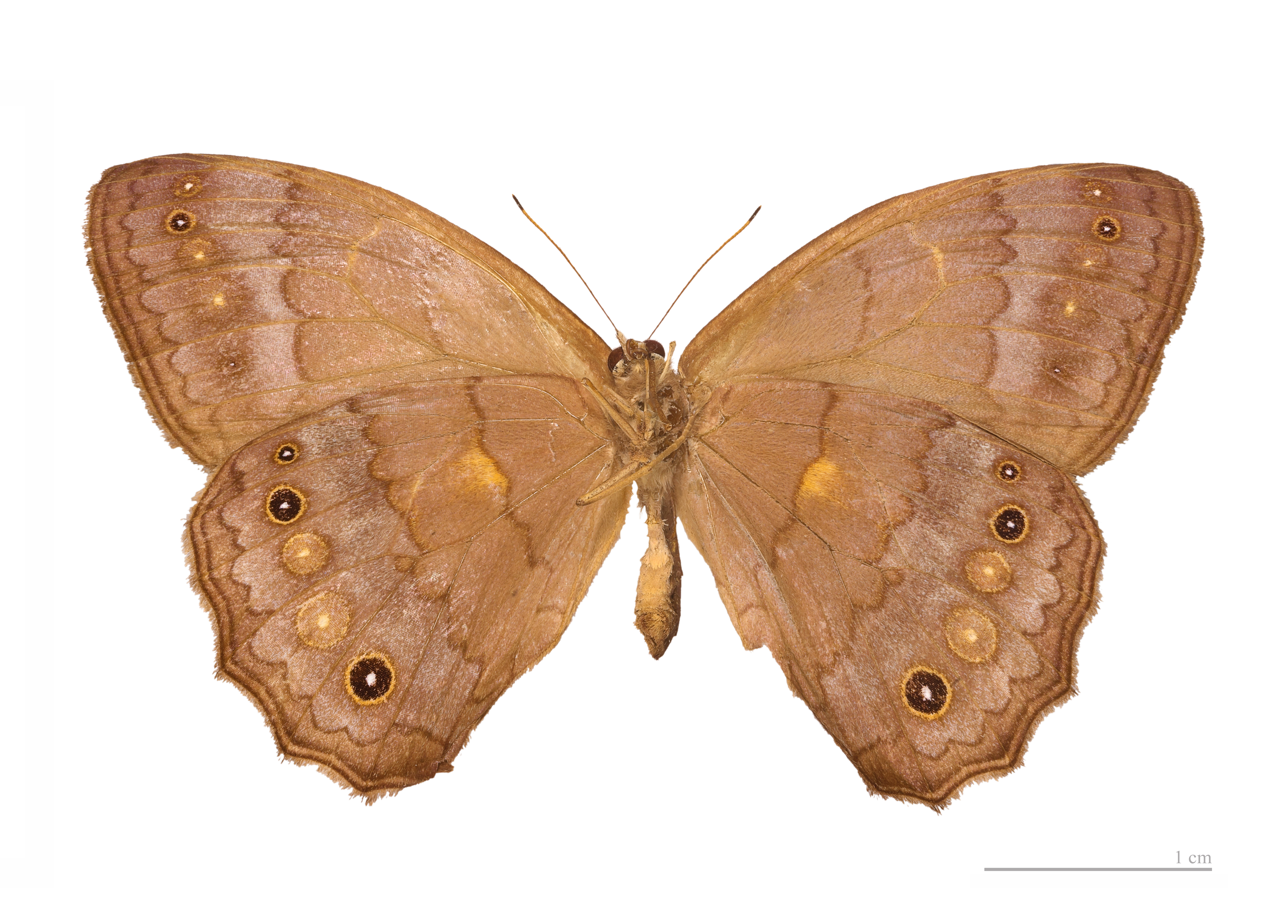
- Pseudodebis valentina

Scientific classification
- Kingdom: Animalia
- Phylum: Arthropoda
- Class: Insecta
- Order: Lepidoptera
- Family: Nymphalidae
- Subfamily: Satyrinae
- Tribe: Satyrini
- Subtribe: Euptychiina
- Genus: Pseudodebis; Forster, 1964

= Pseudodebis =

Genus of butterflies

Pseudodebis is a genus of satyrid butterflies found in the Neotropical realm.

== Species ==
Listed alphabetically:

- Pseudodebis dubiosa Forster, 1964
- Pseudodebis euptychidia (Butler, 1868)
- Pseudodebis marpessa (Hewitson, 1862)
- Pseudodebis valentina (Cramer, [1779])
- Pseudodebis zimri (Butler, 1869)
