= Taygetina peribaea =

Scientific classification
- Kingdom: Animalia
- Phylum: Arthropoda
- Class: Insecta
- Order: Lepidoptera
- Family: Nymphalidae
- Tribe: Satyrini
- Subtribe: Euptychiina
- Genus: Taygetina
- Species: T. peribaea

Binomial name
- Taygetina peribaea (Godman & Salvin, 1880)

Synonyms
- Coeruleotaygetis peribaea

Genus of butterflies

Taygetina peribaea is a species of butterfly in the subfamily Satyrinae. It is found in the Neotropical realm.
