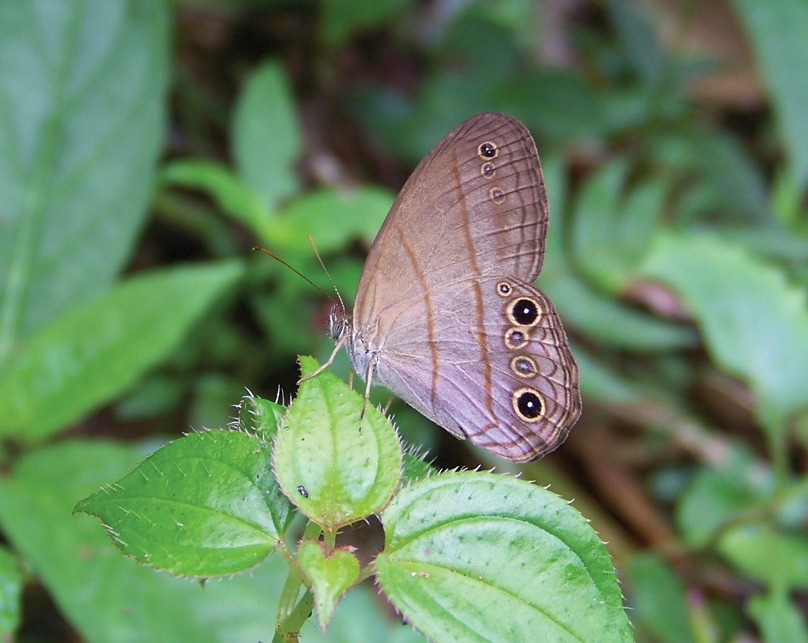
- Amiga arnaca indianacristoi, Venezuela
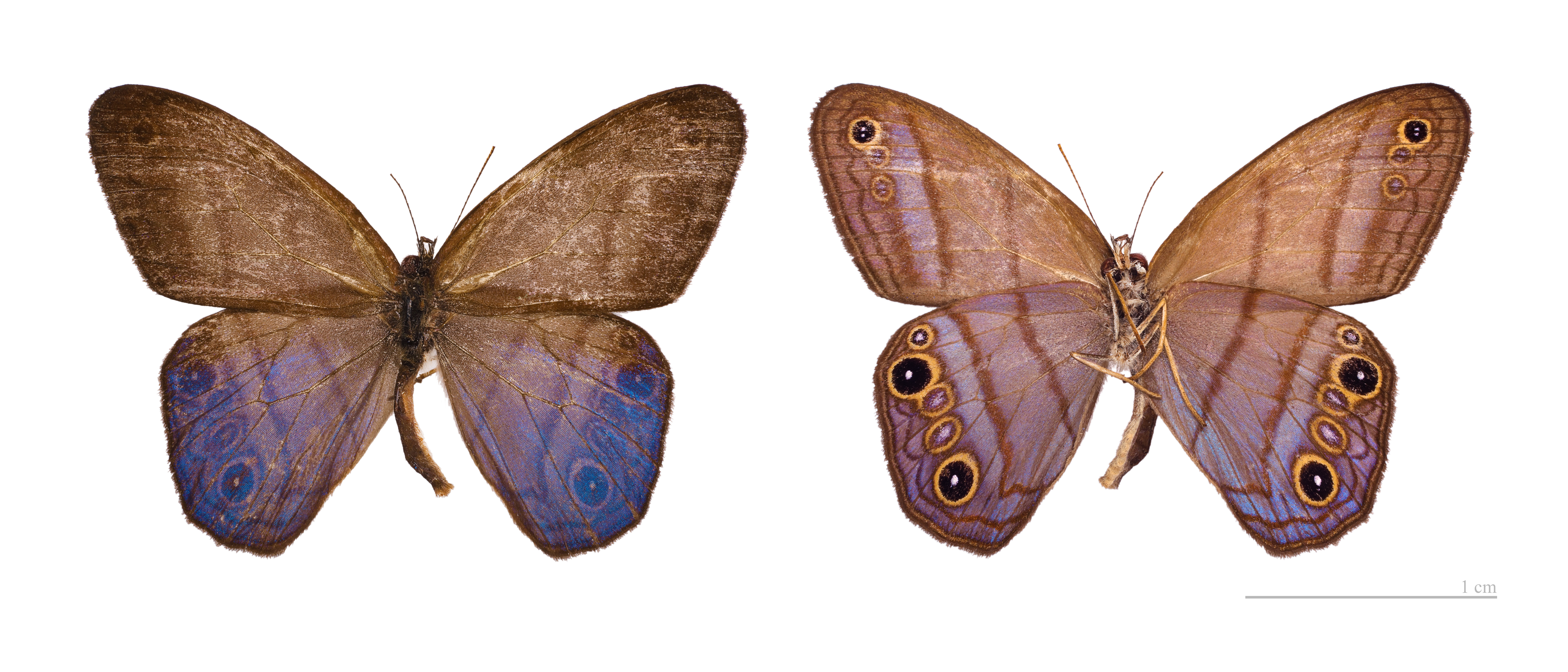

Scientific classification
- Kingdom: Animalia
- Phylum: Arthropoda
- Clade: Pancrustacea
- Class: Insecta
- Order: Lepidoptera
- Family: Nymphalidae
- Subfamily: Satyrinae
- Tribe: Satyrini
- Subtribe: Euptychiina
- Genus: Amiga; Nakahara, Willmott & Espeland, 2019
- Species: A. arnaca

Binomial name
- Amiga arnaca (Fabricius, 1776)

Synonyms
- Papilio arnaca Fabricius, 1776; Papilio ebusa Cramer, [1780]; Euptychia arnaea f. priamis d'Almeida, 1922; Chloreuptychia arnaca (Fabricius, 1776); Euptychia ebusa (Cramer, [1780])

= Amiga arnaca =

Genus of butterflies

Amiga is a monotypic butterfly genus in the family Nymphalidae erected by Shinichi Nakahara, Keith R. Willmott and Marianne Espeland in 2019. Amiga arnaca, formerly of the genus Chloreuptychia, is the only species in the genus Amiga. In 2019, Nakahara et al. described this new genus after molecular phylogenetic research showed it was not closely related to the other species of Chloreuptychia.

Amiga arnaca is found from southern Mexico through most of Central and South America to southern Brazil, and is common in rain and cloud forests. The larvae feed on grasses, including Eleusine, Ichnanthus, Lasiacis, Oplismenus, and Paspalum.

== Subspecies ==
- Amiga arnaca adela Nakahara & Espeland, 2019
- Amiga arnaca arnaca (Fabricius, 1776)
- Amiga arnaca indianacristoi Nakahara & Marín, 2019
- Amiga arnaca sericeella (Bates, 1865)
