= Moneuptychia =

Scientific classification
- Kingdom: Animalia
- Phylum: Arthropoda
- Class: Insecta
- Order: Lepidoptera
- Family: Nymphalidae
- Subfamily: Satyrinae
- Tribe: Satyrini
- Subtribe: Euptychiina
- Genus: Moneuptychia; Forster, 1964

Synonyms
- Carminda Ebert & Dias, 1997; Carminda Ebert & Dias, 1998

Genus of butterflies

Moneuptychia is a genus of satyrid butterflies found in the Neotropical realm.

== Species ==
Listed alphabetically:

- Moneuptychia giffordi Freitas, E.O. Emery & Mielke, 2010
- Moneuptychia griseldis (Weymer, 1911)
- Moneuptychia itapeva Freitas, 2007
- Moneuptychia melchiades (Butler, 1877)
- Moneuptychia paeon (Godart, [1824])
- Moneuptychia soter (Butler, 1877)
- Moneuptychia umuarama (Ebert & Dias, 1997)
