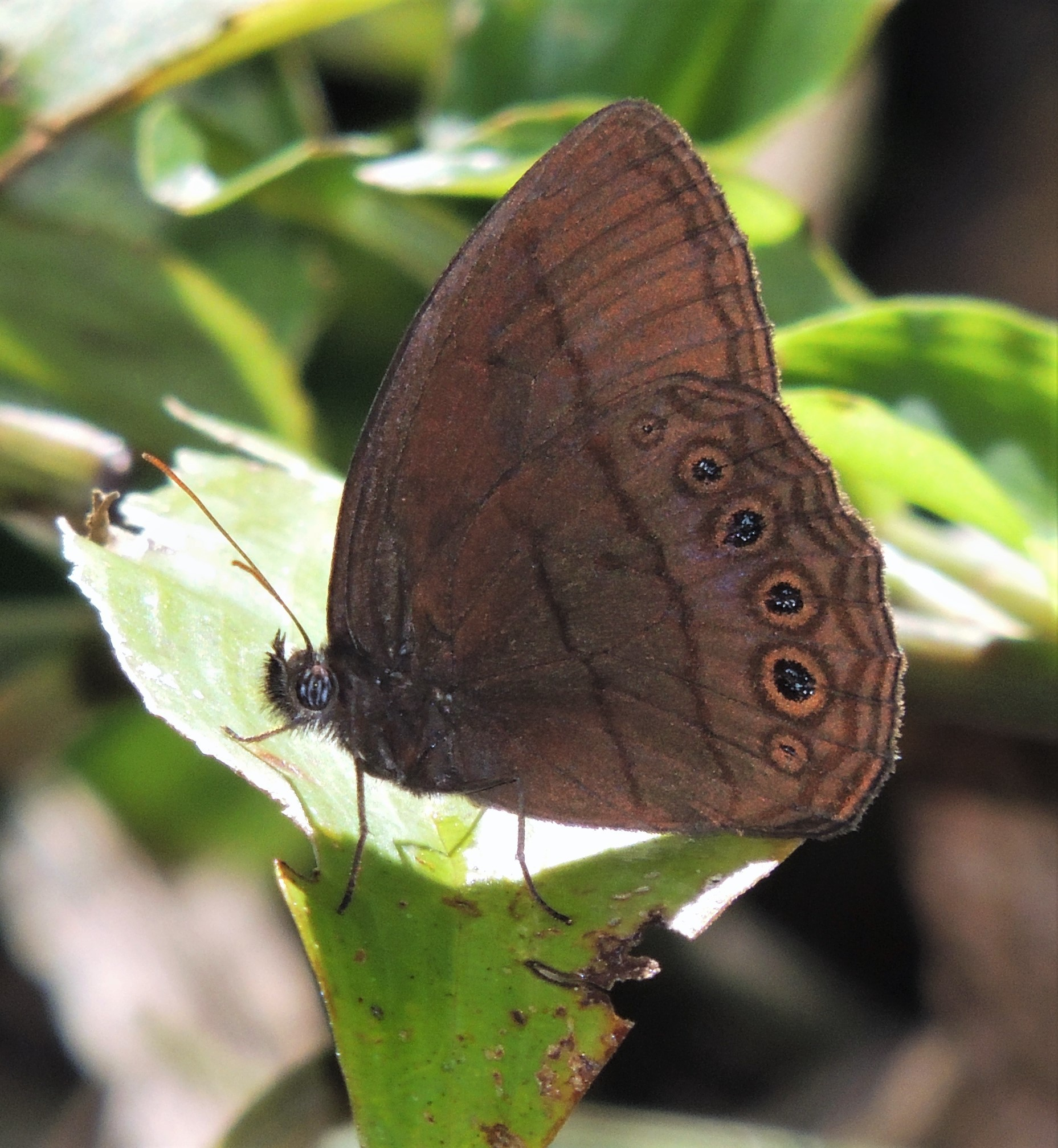
- Zischkaia pacarus

Scientific classification
- Kingdom: Animalia
- Phylum: Arthropoda
- Clade: Pancrustacea
- Class: Insecta
- Order: Lepidoptera
- Family: Nymphalidae
- Subfamily: Satyrinae
- Tribe: Satyrini
- Subtribe: Euptychiina
- Genus: Zischkaia; Forster, 1964=

= Zischkaia =

Genus of butterflies

Zischkaia is a genus of satyrid butterflies found in the Neotropical realm.

== Species ==
Listed alphabetically:

- Zischkaia abanico Nakahara & Petit, 2019
- Zischkaia amalda (Weymer, 1911)
- Zischkaia arctoa Nakahara, 2019
- Zischkaia arenisca Nakahara, Willmott & Hall, 2019
- Zischkaia argyrosflecha Nakahara, Miller & Huertas, 2019
- Zischkaia baku Zacca, Dolibaina & Dias, 2019
- Zischkaia chullachaki Nakahara & Zacca, 2019
- Zischkaia josti Nakahara & Kleckner, 2019
- Zischkaia mielkeorum Dolibaina,Dias & Zacca, 2019
- Zischkaia pacarus (Godart, [1824])
- Zischkaia saundersii (Butler, 1867)
- Zischkaia warreni Dias, Zacca & Dolibaina, 2019
