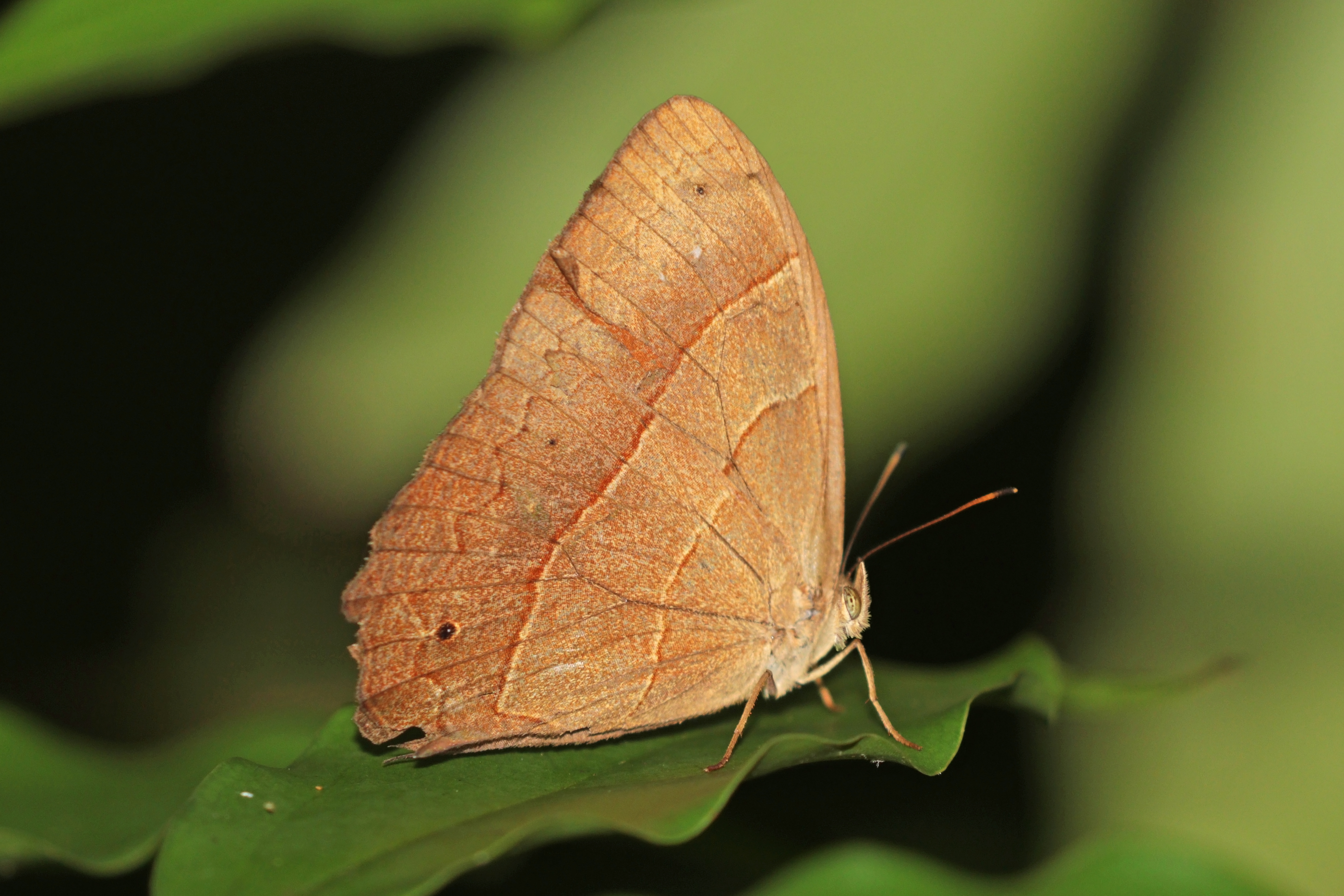
- in Panama

Scientific classification
- Kingdom: Animalia
- Phylum: Arthropoda
- Class: Insecta
- Order: Lepidoptera
- Family: Nymphalidae
- Subfamily: Satyrinae
- Tribe: Satyrini
- Subtribe: Euptychiina
- Genus: Satyrotaygetis; Forster, 1964
- Species: S. satyrina

Binomial name
- Satyrotaygetis satyrina (Bates, 1865)

= Satyrotaygetis =

Wide-bordered satyr

Genus of butterflies

Satyrotaygetis is a monotypic butterfly genus of subfamily Satyrinae in the family Nymphalidae. Its one species, Satyrotaygetis satyrina, is found in the Neotropical realm.
