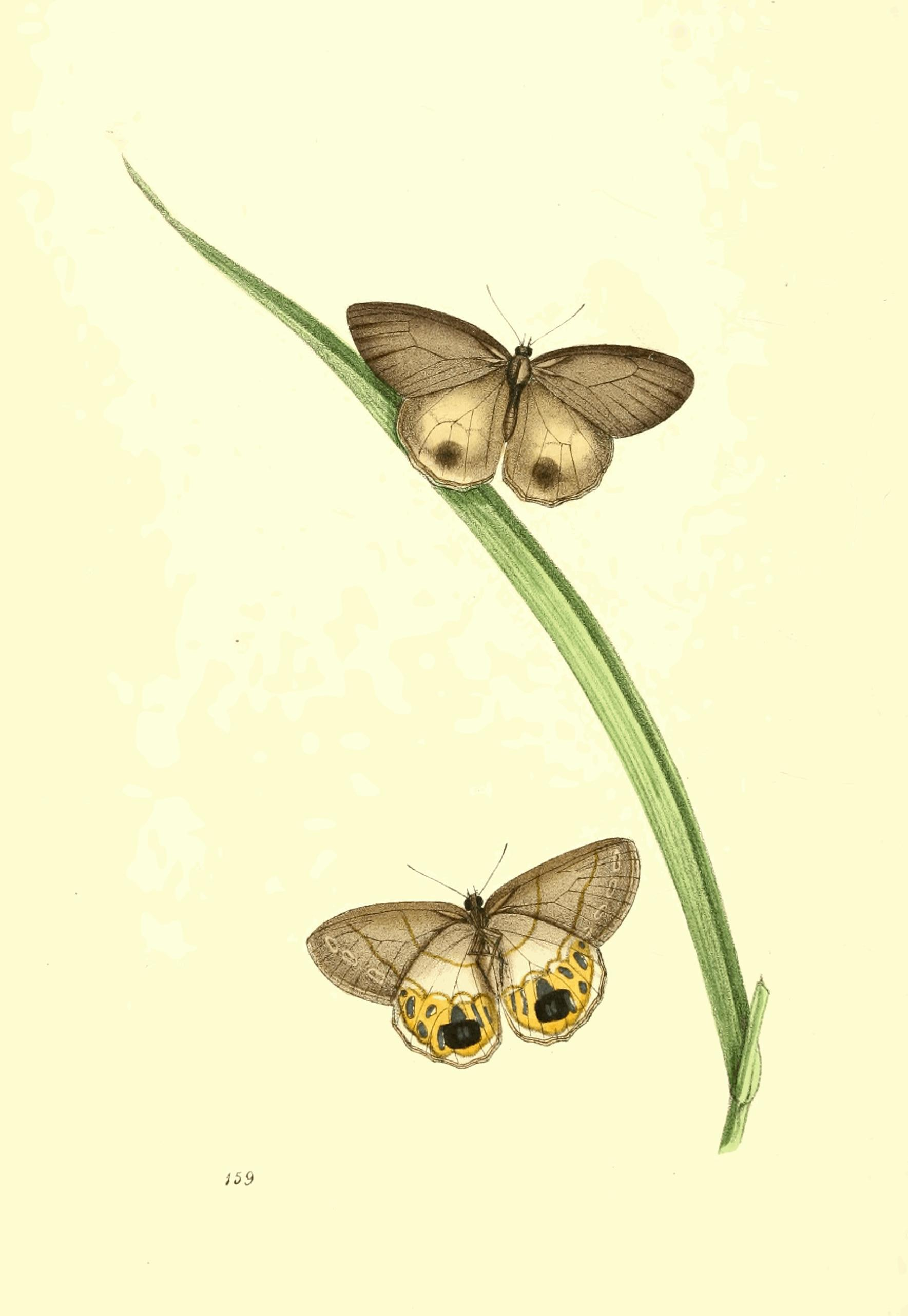
- Splendeuptychia cosmophila

Scientific classification
- Kingdom: Animalia
- Phylum: Arthropoda
- Class: Insecta
- Order: Lepidoptera
- Family: Nymphalidae
- Subfamily: Satyrinae
- Tribe: Satyrini
- Subtribe: Euptychiina
- Genus: Splendeuptychia; Forster, 1964

= Splendeuptychia =

Genus of butterflies

Splendeuptychia is a genus of butterflies in the family Nymphalidae.

== Species ==
- Splendeuptychia ackeryi Huertas, 2009 – Magdalena Valley ringlet
- Splendeuptychia ambra (Weymer, [1911])
- Splendeuptychia ashna (Hewitson, 1869)
- Splendeuptychia aurigera (Weymer, [1911])
- Splendeuptychia boliviensis Forster, 1964
- Splendeuptychia clementia (Butler, 1877)
- Splendeuptychia clorimena (Stoll, 1790)
- Splendeuptychia cosmophila (Hübner, 1823)
- Splendeuptychia doxes (Godart, [1824])
- Splendeuptychia furina (Hewitson, 1862)
- Splendeuptychia hygina (Butler, 1877)
- Splendeuptychia itonis (Hewitson, 1862)
- Splendeuptychia junonia (Butler, 1867)
- Splendeuptychia kendalli Miller, 1978
- Splendeuptychia latia (Butler, 1867)
- Splendeuptychia libitina (Butler, 1870)
- Splendeuptychia mercedes Huertas, 2011
- Splendeuptychia pagyris (Godart, [1824])
- Splendeuptychia purusana (Aurivillius, 1929)
- Splendeuptychia quadrina (Butler, 1869)
- Splendeuptychia salvini (Butler, 1867)
- Splendeuptychia telesphora (Butler, 1877)
- Splendeuptychia toynei Willmott & Hall, 1995
- Splendeuptychia triangula (Aurivillius, 1929)
- Splendeuptychia zischkai Forster, 1964
