= Liolaemus forsteri =

Conservation status
- Endangered (IUCN 3.1)

Scientific classification
- Kingdom: Animalia
- Phylum: Chordata
- Class: Reptilia
- Order: Squamata
- Suborder: Iguania
- Family: Liolaemidae
- Genus: Liolaemus
- Species: L. forsteri

Binomial name
- Liolaemus forsteri Laurent, 1982

Species of lizard

Liolaemus forsteri, commonly known as Forster's tree iguana, is a species of lizard in the family Liolaemidae. The species is endemic to Bolivia.

== Etymology ==
The specific name, forsteri, is in honor of German entomologist Walter Forster.

== Geographic range ==
L. forsteri is found in La Paz Department, Bolivia.

== Habitat ==
The preferred natural habitat of L. forsteri is rocky areas of grassland, at altitudes of 4,100–4,700 m (13,500–15,400 ft). It has also been found in agricultural areas such as in rock piles on potato farms and in pastures of alpacas and llamas.

== Description ==
A large species for its genus, L. forsteri may attain a snout-to-vent length (SVL) of 10.3 cm (4.1 in). It is heavy-bodied, and the digits of all four feet are very short. The dorsal scales are small and tubercular. The ventral scales are larger and smooth.
