= Vanima =

Scientific classification
- Domain: Eukaryota
- Kingdom: Animalia
- Phylum: Arthropoda
- Class: Insecta
- Order: Lepidoptera
- Family: Nymphalidae
- Subfamily: Satyrinae
- Tribe: Satyrini
- Subtribe: Euptychiina
- Genus: Vanima; Zacca, Casagrande & Mielke, 2020

Genus of butterflies

Vanima is a genus of butterflies belonging to the family Nymphalidae.

Species:

- Vanima labe (Butler, 1870)
- Vanima lesbia (Staudinger, 1886)
- Vanima palladia (Butler, 1867)
