= Taydebis =

Scientific classification
- Kingdom: Animalia
- Phylum: Arthropoda
- Class: Insecta
- Order: Lepidoptera
- Family: Nymphalidae
- Subfamily: Satyrinae
- Tribe: Satyrini
- Subtribe: Euptychiina
- Genus: Taydebis; Freitas, 2003
- Species: T. peculiaris

Binomial name
- Taydebis peculiaris (Butler, 1874)

Genus of butterflies

Taydebis is a monotypic butterfly genus in the subfamily Satyrinae in the family Nymphalidae. The genus was established by André Victor Lucci Freitas in 2003. Its one species, Taydebis peculiaris, was found in Brazil and was described by Arthur Gardiner Butler in 1874.
