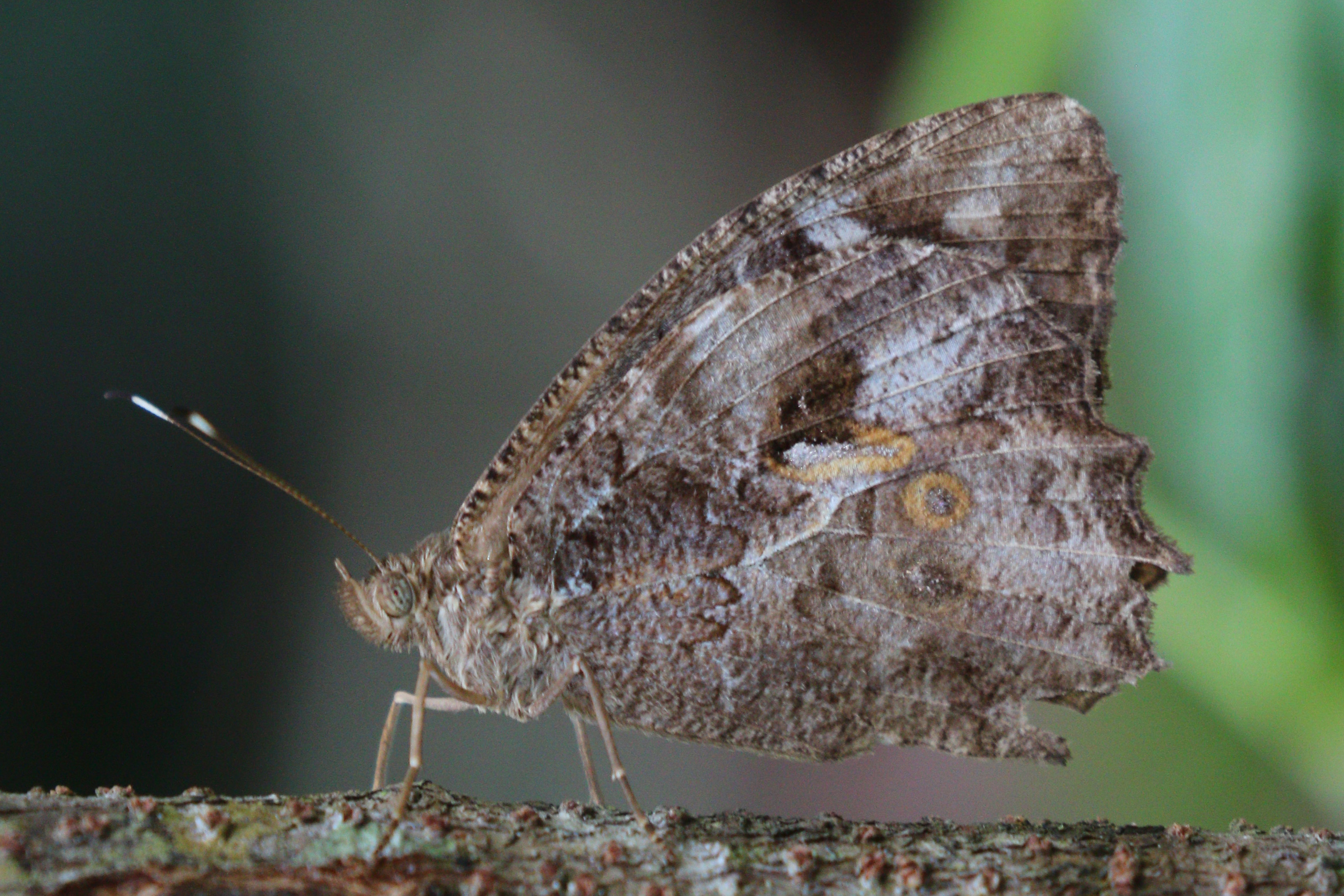
- A. calliomma Crsitalino River, Southern Amazon, Brazil

Scientific classification
- Kingdom: Animalia
- Phylum: Arthropoda
- Class: Insecta
- Order: Lepidoptera
- Family: Nymphalidae
- Subfamily: Satyrinae
- Tribe: Satyrini
- Subtribe: Euptychiina
- Genus: Amphidecta; Butler, 1867

= Amphidecta =

Genus of butterflies

Amphidecta is a genus of satyrid butterfly found in the Neotropical realm.

== Species ==
Listed alphabetically:

- Amphidecta calliomma (C. & R. Felder, 1862)
- Amphidecta pignerator Butler, 1867
- Amphidecta reynoldsi Sharpe, 1890
