= Prenda =

Scientific classification
- Kingdom: Animalia
- Phylum: Arthropoda
- Class: Insecta
- Order: Lepidoptera
- Family: Nymphalidae
- Subfamily: Satyrinae
- Tribe: Satyrini
- Subtribe: Euptychiina
- Genus: Prenda; Freitas & Mielke, 2011
- Species: P. clarissa

Binomial name
- Prenda clarissa Freitas & Mielke, 2011

Genus of butterflies

Prenda is a monotypic butterfly genus of subfamily Satyrinae in the family Nymphalidae. Its one species Prenda clarissa is found in the Neotropical realm.

The generic name Prenda "designates a young woman from Rio Grande do Sul, one of the States from where type specimens were obtained. Prenda is therefore used here in a figurative sense in honor of this well-regarded folklore figure." The specific name "refers to Clarissa, a main character and also the title of the first novel of Érico Veríssimo".
