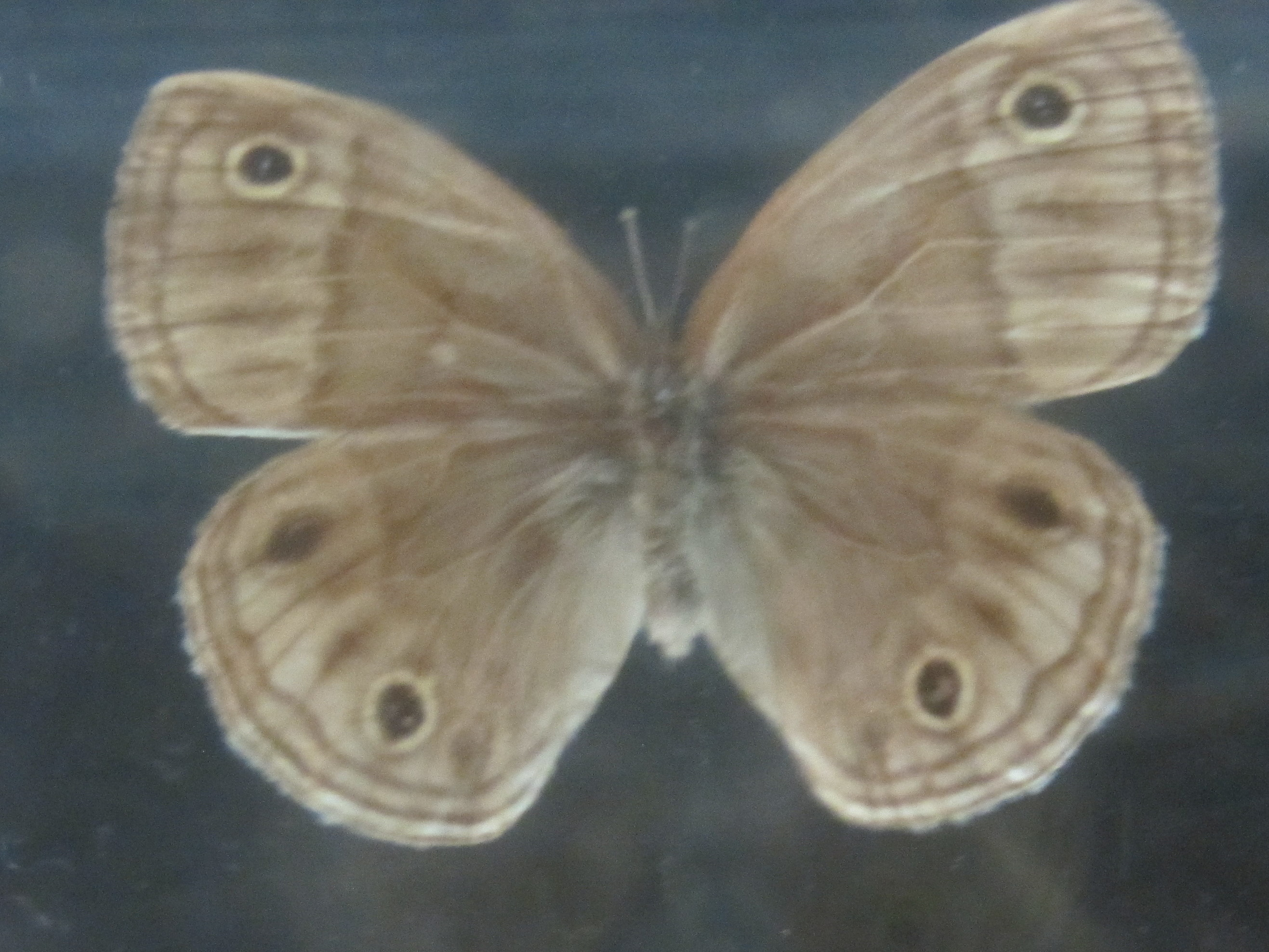

Scientific classification
- Kingdom: Animalia
- Phylum: Arthropoda
- Class: Insecta
- Order: Lepidoptera
- Family: Nymphalidae
- Subtribe: Euptychiina
- Genus: Palaeonympha; Butler, 1871
- Species: P. opalina

Binomial name
- Palaeonympha opalina Butler, 1871

= Palaeonympha =

Genus of butterflies

Palaeonympha is a monotypic butterfly genus of the subfamily Satyrinae in the family Nymphalidae. Its one species, Palaeonympha opalina, is found in Taiwan and China.

The larvae of subspecies macrophthalmia feed on Lophatherum gracile, Oplismenus undulatifolius (including var. microphyllus) and Miscanthus sinensis.

== Subspecies ==
- Palaeonympha opalina opalina (China: Shaanxi, Hupei)
- Palaeonympha opalina macrophthalmia Fruhstorfer, 1911 (Taiwan)
- Palaeonympha opalina bailiensis Yoshino, 2001 (China: northern Yunnan)
