= Paramacera =

Scientific classification
- Kingdom: Animalia
- Phylum: Arthropoda
- Class: Insecta
- Order: Lepidoptera
- Family: Nymphalidae
- Subtribe: Euptychiina
- Genus: Paramacera; Butler, 1868

Synonyms
- Paramecera

Genus of butterflies

Paramacera is a genus of satyrid butterflies found in the Nearctic and Neotropical realms.

== Species ==
Listed alphabetically:

- Paramacera allyni Miller, 1972 – pine satyr
- Paramacera chinanteca Miller, 1972
- Paramacera copiosa Miller, 1972
- Paramacera xicaque (Reakirt, [1867])
