= Theodor Albrecht Friedrich Wohlfahrt =

German zoologist and entomologist who specialised in Lepidoptera

Theodor Albrecht Friedrich Wohlfahrt (19 September 1907 in Ludwigshafen am Rhein - 7 February 2006 in Würzburg) was a German zoologist and entomologist who specialised in Lepidoptera.

He illustrated The five-volume standard work Die Schmetterlinge Mitteleuropas (1954–1981) for which Walter Forster wrote the texts with drawings and watercolours. In 142 the Berlin Reich Ministry assigned him to the University of Würzburg, where he worked at the Zoological Institute (then at Röntgenring 10) as a scientific assistant and private lecturer and later until 1972 as professor of zoology and comparative anatomy.

Most of his insect collection is housed in the Bavarian State Collection of Zoology in Munich, while a few boxes with native butterflies remained in the teaching collection of the Biozentrum in Würzburg.
