= Marianne Espeland =

Norwegian entomologist

- Born: Norway
- Education: Stockholm University / Swedish Museum of Natural History
- Known for: Phylogenomic classification of butterflies; systematics of Lepidoptera and Trichoptera
- Scientific career
- Fields: Entomology; Lepidoptera; Trichoptera; Phylogenomics; Systematics
- Workplaces: Leibniz Institute for the Analysis of Biodiversity Change (LIB), Museum Koenig Bonn; Zoological Research Museum Alexander Koenig (ZFMK); Florida Museum of Natural History (postdoctoral research); Harvard University (postdoctoral research)

Marianne Espeland is a Norwegian entomologist specializing in the systematics, phylogenomics, and biogeography of Lepidoptera (butterflies and moths) and Trichoptera (caddisflies). She is Curator of Lepidoptera and Head of the Lepidoptera Section at the Leibniz Institute for the Analysis of Biodiversity Change (LIB) in Bonn, Germany, based at the Museum Koenig (formerly the Zoological Research Museum Alexander Koenig, ZFMK). She was the lead author of a widely cited 2018 study that produced a comprehensive, dated phylogeny of butterflies and revised their higher-level classification.

== Education and career ==
Espeland earned her PhD in systematic zoology through Stockholm University and the Swedish Museum of Natural History, where her early research focused on the phylogeny and diversification of caddisflies (Trichoptera), including several New Caledonian lineages.

She conducted postdoctoral research at the Florida Museum of Natural History's McGuire Center for Lepidoptera and Biodiversity at the University of Florida, where she led the team that assembled a butterfly phylogeny using a 35-fold increase in genetic data over prior studies, work covered in university and science-news reporting at the time. She also conducted postdoctoral research in the laboratory of Naomi Pierce in the Department of Organismic and Evolutionary Biology at Harvard University, working on the evolution of myrmecophily (ant association) in the subfamily Aphnaeinae and on the higher-level phylogeny and biogeography of the family Riodinidae.

She subsequently joined the Zoological Research Museum Alexander Koenig (ZFMK) in Bonn, which became part of the newly formed Leibniz Institute for the Analysis of Biodiversity Change (LIB) in 2021. At LIB, she leads the Lepidoptera curatorial section and a research group working on the systematics and evolution of butterflies and moths.

== Research ==
Espeland's research combines classical taxonomy and systematics with genomic and museomic approaches, including anchored hybrid enrichment and target capture methods applied to both fresh and museum specimens, to study the diversification, biogeography, and classification of Lepidoptera and Trichoptera.

In the 2018 Current Biology study, Espeland and colleagues analyzed genetic markers from butterfly species representing nearly all butterfly tribes, finding that swallowtails were the first lineage to diverge from other butterflies and that the classification of blues and hairstreaks required substantial revision, since blues were found to be nested within hairstreaks rather than forming a separate sister group. Discussing the finding, Espeland noted that although both groups had appeared stable over time, the new data showed a considerable rearrangement of the classification was needed.

In 2022, Espeland and Lars Podsiadlowski co-authored a Perspective article in Science accompanying a study on the gene WntA and the regulatory basis of butterfly wing-pattern evolution, discussing how gene-regulatory elements shape rapidly evolving wing traits.

She was also a co-author of a large-scale 2019 study on the evolutionary timing and diversification of butterflies and moths as a whole, published in the Proceedings of the National Academy of Sciences, and of a 2023 global phylogeny of butterflies in Nature Ecology & Evolution examining their evolutionary history, host-plant associations, and biogeographic origins.

Espeland is a co-author on the 2024 description of Nivaliodes, a new genus of Andean satyrine butterfly discovered in Peru that lives at up to 4,800 metres above sea level and has been observed resting directly on snow, an unusual behaviour for a tropical butterfly lineage; the discovery received coverage from the Linnean Society of London.

Her taxonomic work also spans caddisflies, including phylogenetic studies of the families Ecnomidae and Polycentropodidae, and museomics methodology, including a study showing that the pesticide dichlorvos, used to protect insect collections, impedes DNA extraction and amplification from museum specimens.

== Selected publications ==
- Kawahara, A.Y., Plotkin, D., Espeland, M., Meusemann, K., Toussaint, E.F.A., et al. (2019). "Phylogenomics reveals the evolutionary timing and pattern of butterflies and moths." Proceedings of the National Academy of Sciences 116(45): 22657–22663.
- Espeland, M., Breinholt, J., Willmott, K.R., Warren, A.D., Vila, R., Toussaint, E.F.A., et al. (2018). "A Comprehensive and Dated Phylogenomic Analysis of Butterflies." Current Biology 28(5): 770–778.e5.
- Kawahara, A.Y., Storer, C., Carvalho, A.P.S., Plotkin, D.M., Condamine, F.L., et al. (2023). "A global phylogeny of butterflies reveals their evolutionary history, ancestral hosts and biogeographic origins." Nature Ecology & Evolution 7(6): 903–913.
- Espeland, M., Podsiadlowski, L. (2022). "How butterfly wings got their pattern." Science 378(6618): 350–351.
- Pyrcz, T.W., Mahecha-J., O., Boyer, P., et al. & Espeland, M. (2024). "A snow-dwelling tropical butterfly? An unprecedented discovery of a new genus of the Pedaliodes clade in an extreme, high-altitude Andean environment (Lepidoptera: Nymphalidae: Satyrinae)." Zoological Journal of the Linnean Society 202(2): zlae112.
- Espeland, M., Hall, J.P.W., DeVries, P.J., Lees, D.C., et al. (2015). "Ancient Neotropical origin and recent recolonisation: Phylogeny, biogeography and diversification of the Riodinidae (Lepidoptera: Papilionoidea)." Molecular Phylogenetics and Evolution 93: 296–306.
- Boyle, J.H., Kaliszewska, Z.A., Espeland, M., Suderman, T.R., Fleming, J., Heath, A., Pierce, N.E. (2015). "Phylogeny of the Aphnaeinae: myrmecophilous African butterflies with carnivorous and herbivorous life histories." Systematic Entomology 40(1): 169–182.
- Buschbacher, K., Ahrens, D., Espeland, M., Steinhage, V. (2020). "Image-based species identification of wild bees using convolutional neural networks." Ecological Informatics 55: 101017.
- Mayer, C., Dietz, L., Call, E., Kukowka, S., Martin, S., Espeland, M. (2021). "Adding leaves to the Lepidoptera tree: capturing hundreds of nuclear genes from old museum specimens." Systematic Entomology 46(3): 649–671.
- Espeland, M., Irestedt, M., Johanson, K.A., Åkerlund, M., Bergh, J.E., Källersjö, M. (2010). "Dichlorvos exposure impedes extraction and amplification of DNA from insects in museum collections." Frontiers in Zoology 7(1): 2.
- Podsiadlowski, L., Tunström, K., Espeland, M., Wheat, C.W. (2021). "The Genome Assembly and Annotation of the Apollo Butterfly Parnassius apollo, a Flagship Species for Conservation Biology." Genome Biology and Evolution 13(8): evab122.
