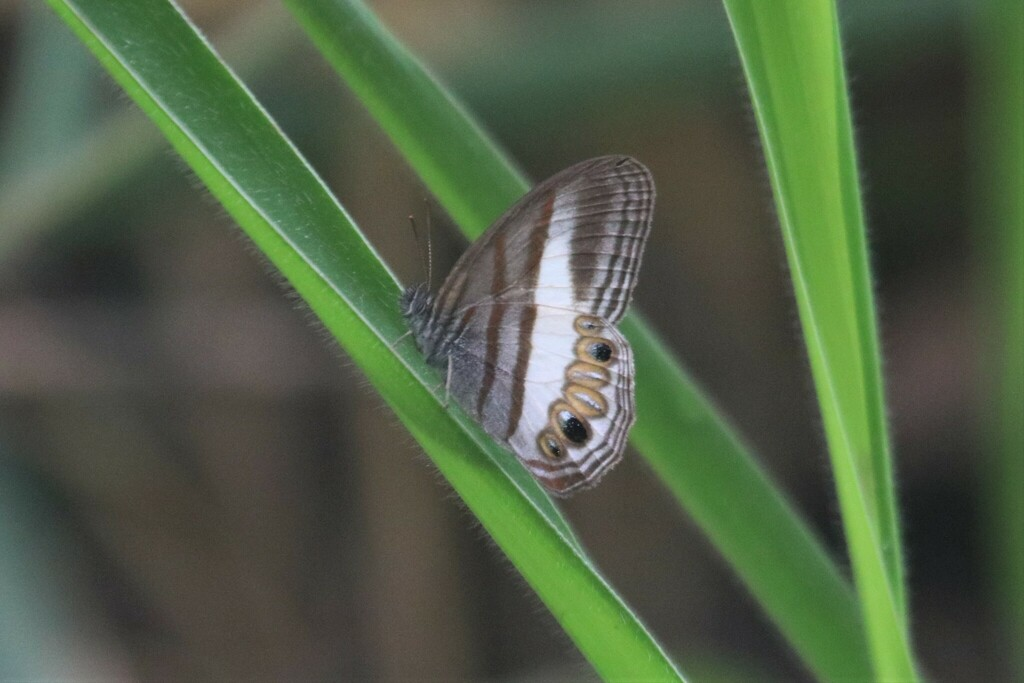

Scientific classification
- Kingdom: Animalia
- Phylum: Arthropoda
- Clade: Pancrustacea
- Class: Insecta
- Order: Lepidoptera
- Family: Nymphalidae
- Genus: Splendeuptychia
- Species: S. ackeryi

Binomial name
- Splendeuptychia ackeryi Huertas et al., 2009

= Splendeuptychia ackeryi =

Species of butterfly

Splendeuptychia ackeryi, the Magdalena Valley ringlet, is a species of butterfly first classified in 2009. Its distinguishing feature is unusually hairy mouthparts, which have been compared to a moustache. The specimen was initially collected in the dry Magdalena River Valley of Colombia by Blanca Huertas. It resembles Splendeuptychia toynei which is endemic to Ecuadorian east slope.

== Description ==
The males have naked, dark brown eyes with palpi twice as long as head and brown antennae. Their abdomen is also dark brown with hairy scales and wings of about 21.2 mm. They have 2 anal bands and broad marginal bands in forewings and hindwings. The hindwings have two brown marginal lines and spots with diffused edges between the veins along with dark brown legs.

Genitalia: Uncus, curved and pointed at end. Subuncus L-shaped bending towards uncus and tapering to point, almost extending as long as tip of uncus. Valvae, with rather flat mid-section, hirsute distally and tip of valvae ending with a short, pointed projection and heavily sclerotised. Their aedeagus is bent with two parallel cornuti near the vesica.

The females are almost identical to males, but forewings (FW) are more rounded and with paler ground colour.

Genitalia: Not fully examined due to the only female specimen available having been attacked by pests. Their bursa is spherical, paired signa composed of two narrow bands of densely set teeth, signa two thirds length of bursa, and cervix highly sclerotised at base.

== Etymology ==
The name ackeryi is formed as the genitive singular of a fictional second declension masculine Latin noun. The epithet is dedicated to Phil Ackery, former Collections Manager of Lepidoptera at the Natural History Museum where he worked for more than 35 years. He has been an inspirational figure for butterfly research, prolific author and mentor of the first author in her career at the BMNH.
