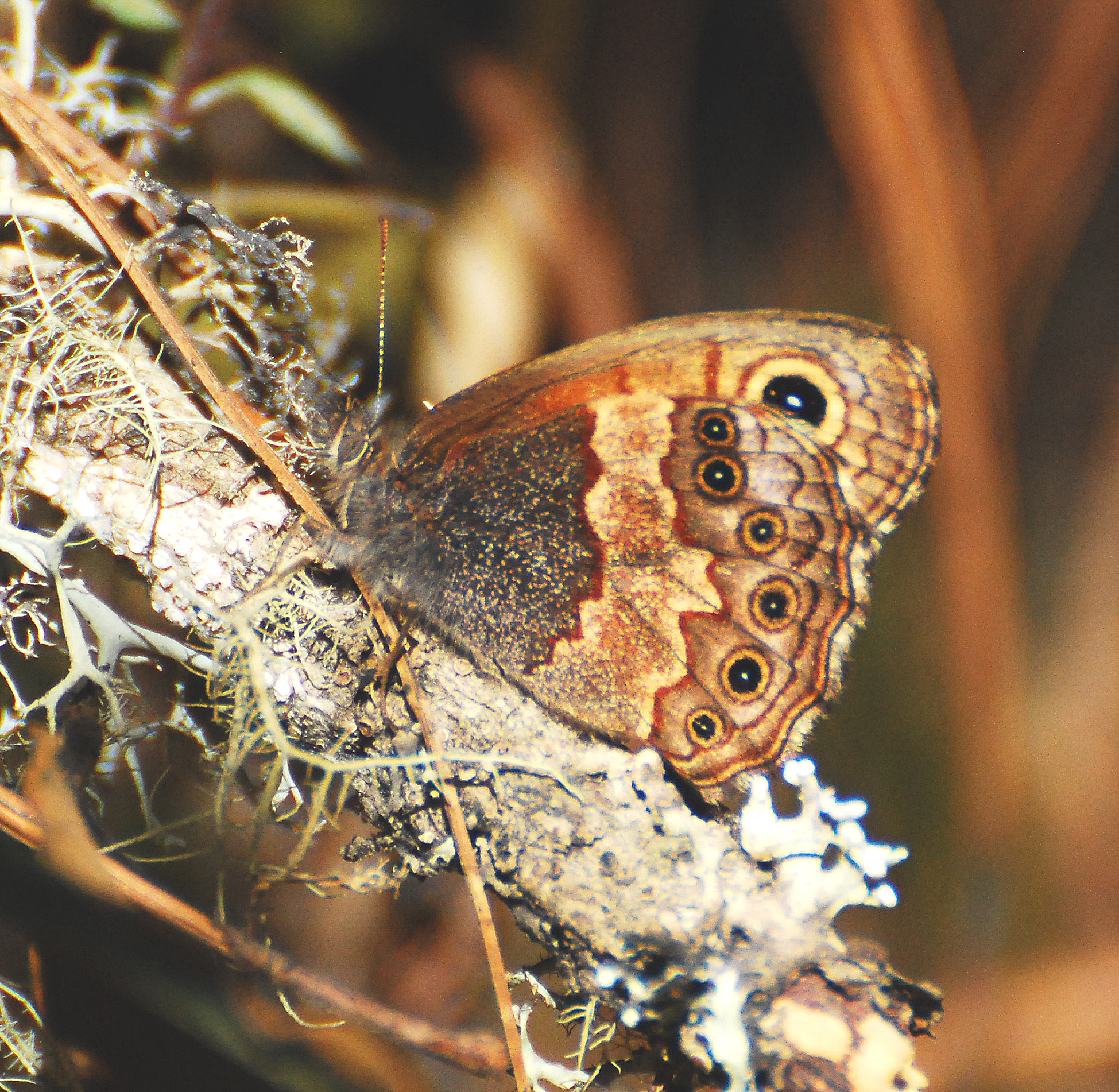

Scientific classification
- Kingdom: Animalia
- Phylum: Arthropoda
- Class: Insecta
- Order: Lepidoptera
- Family: Nymphalidae
- Genus: Paramacera
- Species: P. allyni

Binomial name
- Paramacera allyni Miller, 1972

Synonyms
- Paramacera xicaque allyni

= Paramacera allyni =

Arizona pine satyr

Species of butterfly

Paramacera allyni, the Arizona pine satyr or pine satyr, is a butterfly of the family Nymphalidae. It is found in North America from the mountains in south-eastern Arizona to Mexico.

The wingspan is 35–48 mm. Adults are on wing from June to August in one generation per year.
