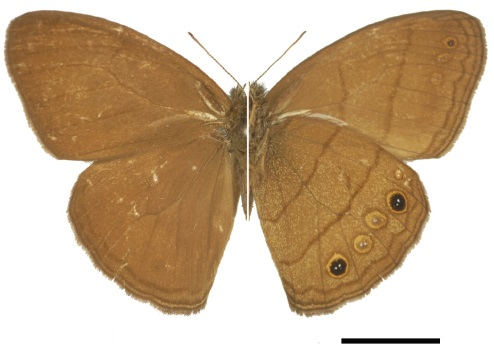

Scientific classification
- Kingdom: Animalia
- Phylum: Arthropoda
- Class: Insecta
- Order: Lepidoptera
- Family: Nymphalidae
- Genus: Malaveria; Viloria & Benmesbah, 2021
- Species: M. mimas

Binomial name
- Malaveria mimas (Godman, 1905)

Synonyms
- Magneuptychia mimas (Godman, 1905); Euptychia mimas Godman, 1905

= Malaveria mimas =

Species of butterfly

Malaveria mimas is a species of butterfly of the family Nymphalidae. It is found in Bolivia and Colombia.
