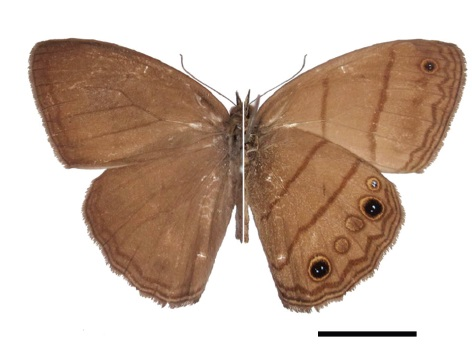

Scientific classification
- Kingdom: Animalia
- Phylum: Arthropoda
- Class: Insecta
- Order: Lepidoptera
- Family: Nymphalidae
- Genus: Malaveria; Viloria & Benmesbah, 2021
- Species: M. alcinoe

Binomial name
- Malaveria alcinoe (C. & R. Felder, 1867)

Synonyms
- Magneuptychia alcinoe (C. Felder & R. Felder, 1867); Neonympha alcinoe C. & R. Felder, 1867; Euptychia benedicta Butler, 1877; Euptychia pamela Hayward, 1957

= Malaveria alcinoe =

Species of butterfly

Malaveria alcinoe, the Alcinoe satyr, is a species of butterfly of the family Nymphalidae. It is found from Costa Rica to Colombia, Ecuador, Bolivia and Venezuela.

The wingspan is about 38 mm.

The larvae feed on grasses.
