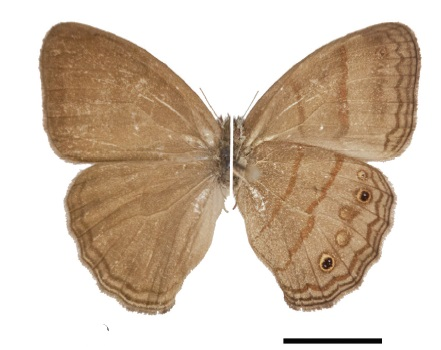
- Female
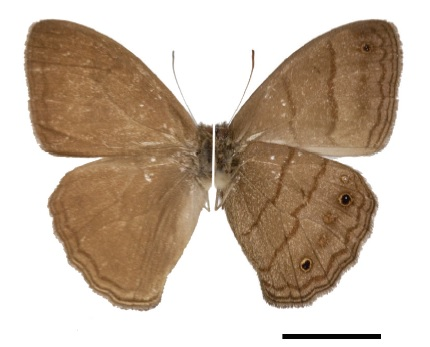
- Male

Scientific classification
- Kingdom: Animalia
- Phylum: Arthropoda
- Class: Insecta
- Order: Lepidoptera
- Family: Nymphalidae
- Genus: Malaveria
- Species: M. nebulosa

Binomial name
- Malaveria nebulosa (Butler, 1867)

Synonyms
- Magneuptychia nebulosa (Butler, 1867); Euptychia nebulosa Butler, 1867

= Malaveria nebulosa =

Species of butterfly

Malaveria nebulosa is a species of butterfly in the family Nymphalidae. It is found in northern Venezuela, where it has been recorded only from the slope of the Serranía del Litoral in the Venezuelan Coastal Range. Records from Colombia and Panama are based on misidentifications.

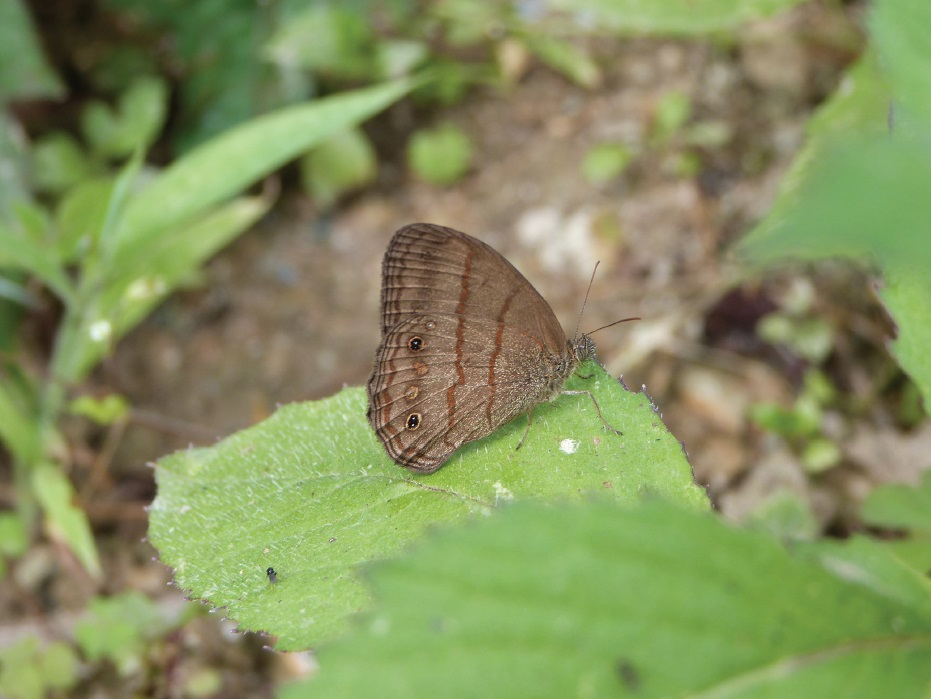

The length of the forewings is 19.6–21.5 mm for males and 19.6–21 mm for females. The forewing ground color is brown with the submarginal band dark brown, undulating and extending from the apex towards the tornus, delimiting a slightly darker area. The marginal band is dark brown and extends from the apex towards the tornus. The fringe is grayish brown. The hindwing color is brown with the submarginal band dark brown, undulating and extending from the apex towards the tornus. It is convex in each cell. The marginal band is dark brown and extends from the apex towards the tornus. The postmarginal and tornal areas are pale ocher, and the fringe is grayish brown.
