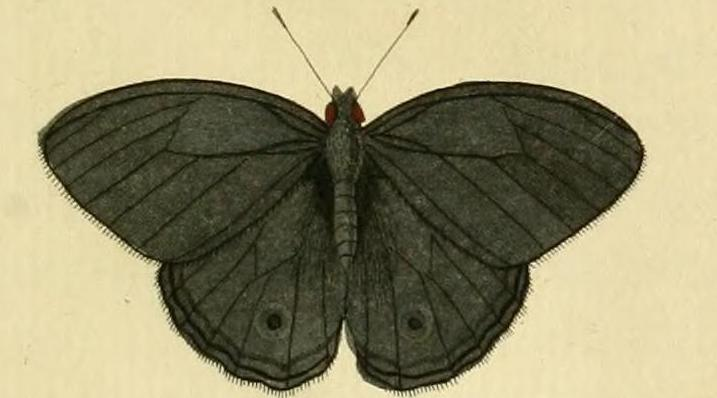

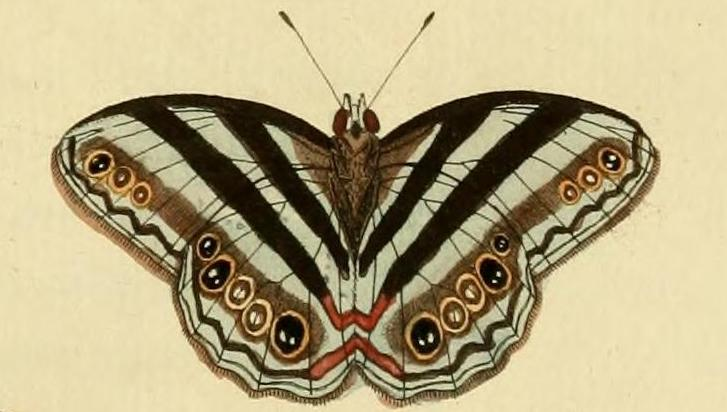

Scientific classification
- Kingdom: Animalia
- Phylum: Arthropoda
- Clade: Pancrustacea
- Class: Insecta
- Order: Lepidoptera
- Family: Nymphalidae
- Genus: Modica
- Species: M. fugitiva

Binomial name
- Modica fugitiva (Lamas, [1997])

Synonyms
- Magneuptychia fugitiva Lamas, [1997]; Papilio helle Cramer, [1779] (preocc)

= Modica fugitiva =

Species of butterfly

Modica fugitiva is a species of butterfly of the family Nymphalidae. It is found in Suriname.
