= Gustav Weymer =

German entomologist (1833-1914)

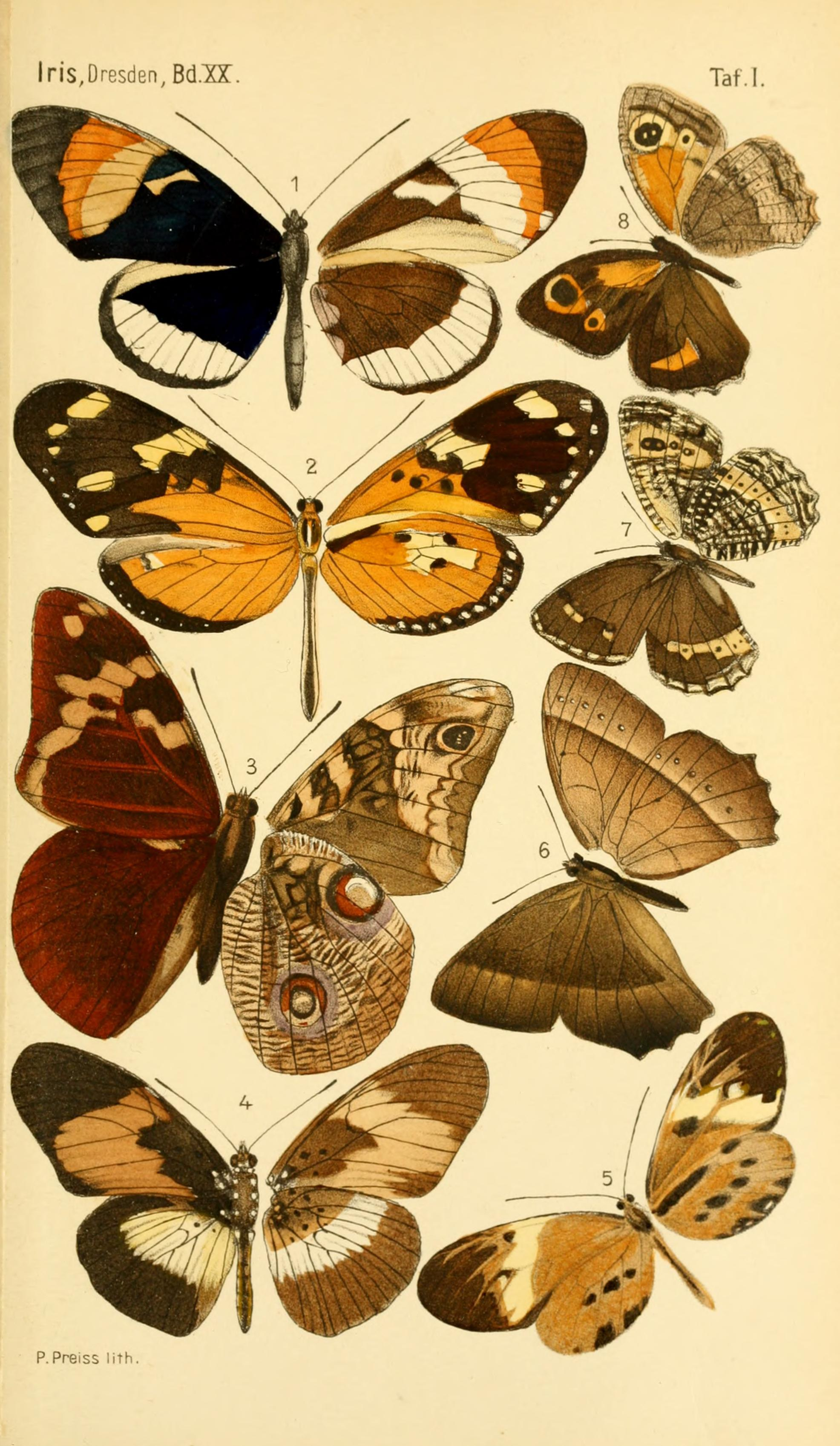
Plate 2 from Exotische Lepidopteren 1907

Gustav Weymer (1833–1914) was a German entomologist. He described many new taxa of butterflies from specimens collected by Alphons Stübel in South America.

His own collections and those he worked on are conserved in Museum für Naturkunde in Berlin and Naturkundemuseum Leipzig.

== Works ==
- Weymer, G. 1878. Macrolepidopteren der Umgegend von Elberfeld. 53 p.
- Weymer, G. 1885. Exotische Lepidopteren III. Beitrag zur Lepidopteren Fauna von Nias. - Stettiner Entomologische Zeitung 46:257-285, pl.1-2
- Weymer, G. and Maassen P. J. 1890. Lepidopteren gesammelt auf einer Reise durch Colombia, Ecuador, Perú, Brasilien, Argentinien und Bolivien in den Jahren 1868-1877 von Alphons Stübel. Berlin, A. Asher & Co. [1], xi, 182 pp., 9 pls.
- Maassen & Weymer, G. W. 1869–1885. Beiträge zur Schmetterlingskunde. - — 1–5:1–10, pls 1–50
- Weymer, G. W. 1892. Exotische Lepidopteren VI. Aus dem Afrikanischen Faunagebiet. - Stettiner Entomologische Zeitung 53(4–5):79–125.
- Weymer, G. 1893. Revision der ersten Gruppe der Gattung Heliconius. - Deutsche entomologische Zeitschrift, Iris 06: 281 — 345, pl. 4-5
- Weymer, G. W. 1896. Einige afrikanische Heteroceren. - Berliner entomologische Zeitschrift 41(2):79–90.
- Weymer, G. 1902. Zwei neue Tagfalter aus Neuguinea. - Entomologische Zeitschrift 16 (2):5-6
- Weymer, G. W. 1907. Exotische Lepideptoren - Deutsche Entomologische Zeitschrift, Iris 21:1-54, pl.1-2
- Weymer, G. 1908, Kurze Notizen über die Lepidopterenfauna der Hildener Heide. – Ber. über d. Vers. Botan. und Zoolog. Ver. f. Rheinl.-Westf., S. 34-37, Bonn.
- Weymer, G. W. 1909. Exotische Lepidopteren. - Deutsche entomologische Zeitschrift, Iris 22:1-35.
- Weymer, G. 1912. 4 Familie: Satyridae. In Seitz, A.(ed.): Die Gross-Schmetterlinge der Erde,2, Exotische Fauna, 5, Stuttgart, A Kernen
