= Walter Forster (entomologist) =

German entomologist (1910–1986)

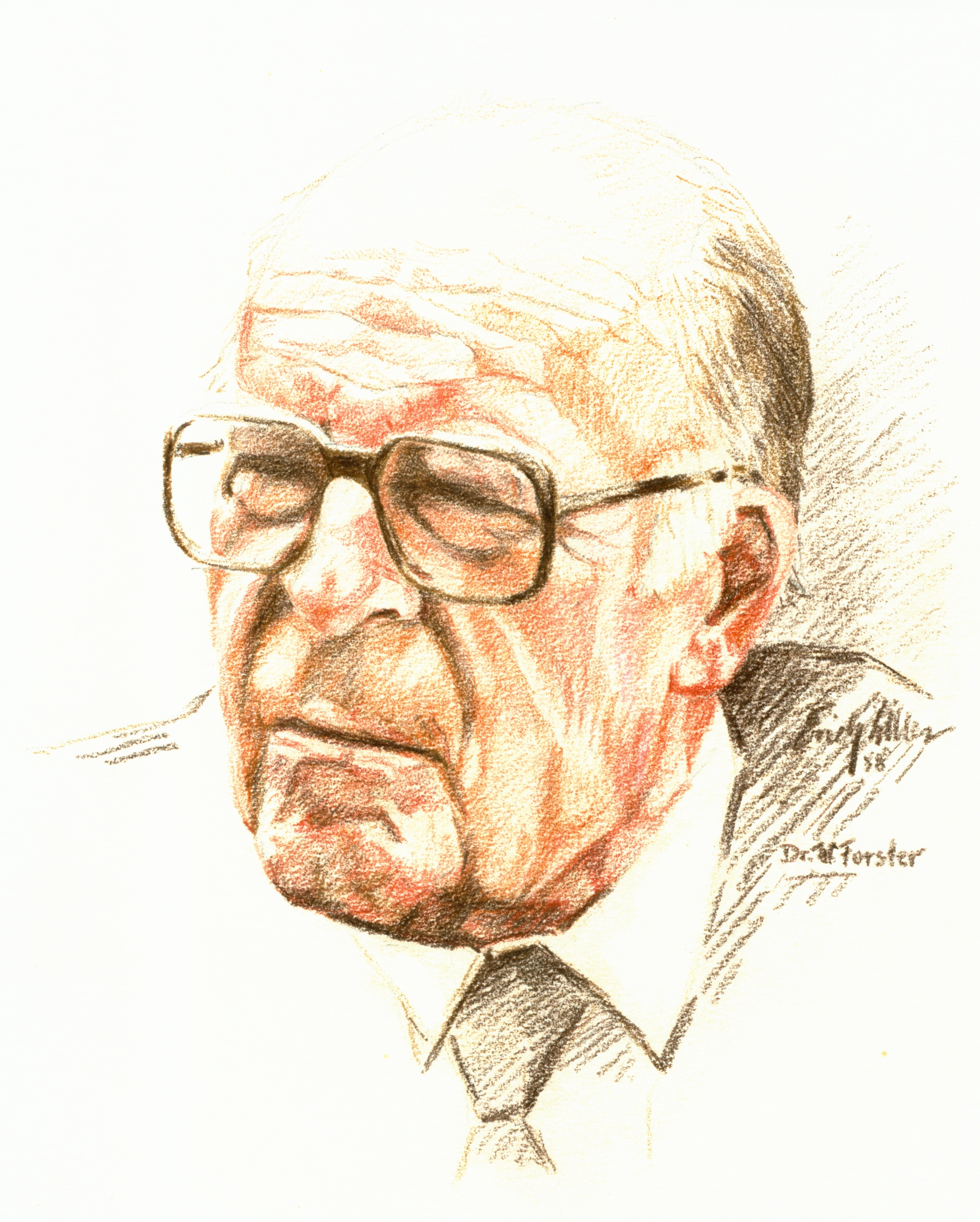
- Portrait of Forster by Erich Diller
- Born: 12 July 1910; Hörbach, Bavaria, Germany
- Died: 25 December 1986 (aged 76); Augsburg, Bavaria
- Occupation: Entomologist
- Children: 2

Walter Forster (12 July 1910 – 25 December 1986) was a German entomologist.

He worked at the Bavarian State Collection of Zoology (Zoologische Staatssammlung München) and led two scientific collecting trips to South America.

== Legacy ==
Forster is commemorated in the scientific name of a species of South American lizard, Liolaemus forsteri.

== Publications ==
- Forster W (1964). "Beiträge zur Kenntnis der Insektenfauna Boliviens. XIX. Lepidoptera III. Satyridae". Veröffentlichungen der Zoologischen Staatssammlung München 8: 51–188. (in German).
- Forster, W. & Theodor A. Wohlfahrt Die Schmetterlinge Mitteleuropas Stuttgart (Franckh).
  - (1954): Bd. I: Biologie der Schmetterlinge.
  - (1976): Die Schmetterlinge Mitteleuropas. Bd. II: Tagfalter. Diurna (Rhopalocera und Hesperiidae).
  - Bd. III: Spinner und Schwärmer (Bombyces und Sphinges)
  - (1971) Bd. IV: Eulen (Noctuidae). –
  - (1980): Spanner (Geometridae).

He also Walter Forster translated and edited the German edition of A field guide to the butterflies of Britain and Europe by Lionel George Higgins and Norman D. Riley. In doing so, he shifted the focus of the presentation from British to general European conditions and adapted it to new taxonomic findings.
