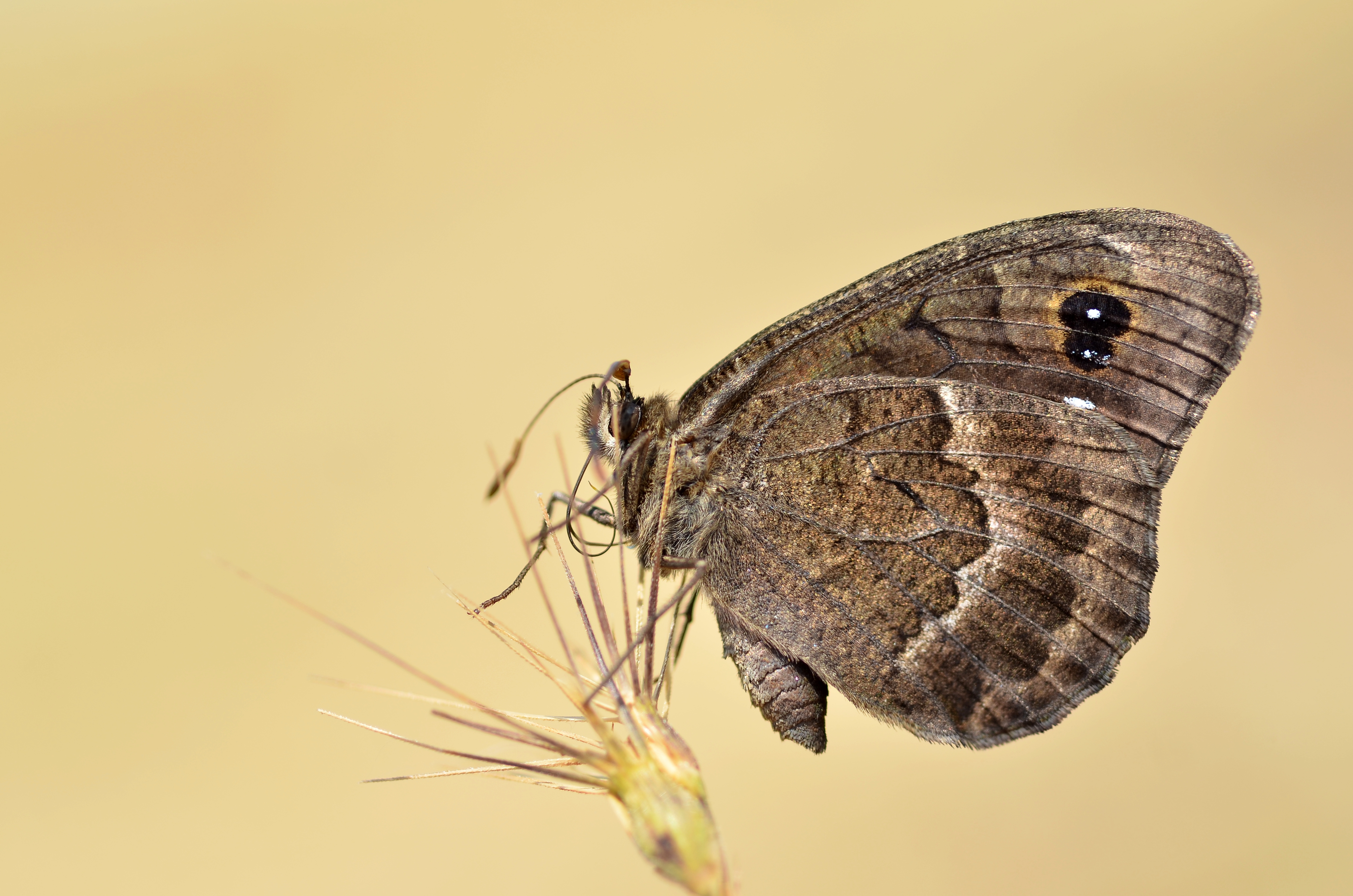
- Satyrus actaea, Languedoc-Roussillon, France
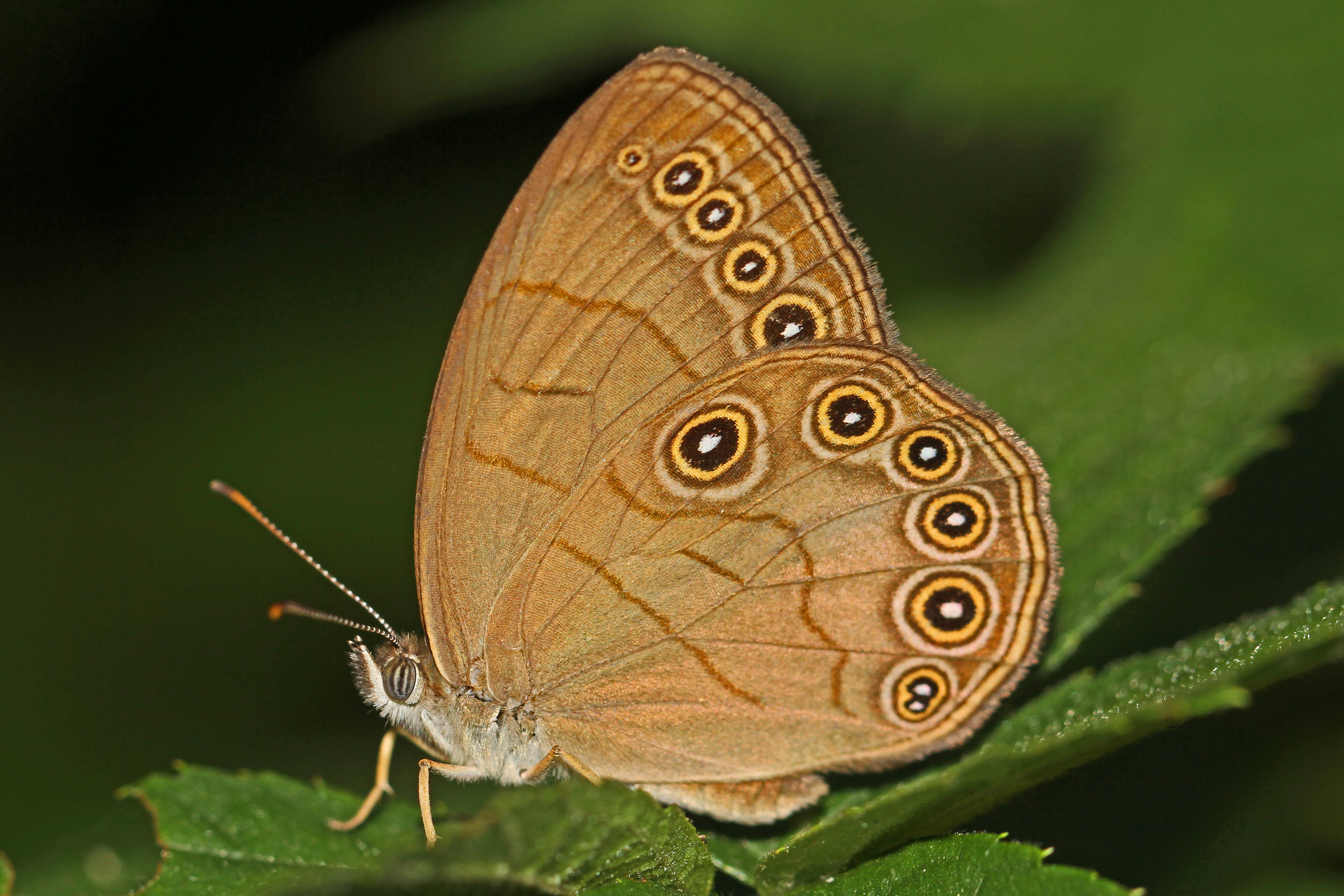
- Lethe appalachia (syn. Satyrodes appalachia), Virginia, United States

Scientific classification
- Kingdom: Animalia
- Phylum: Arthropoda
- Clade: Pancrustacea
- Class: Insecta
- Order: Lepidoptera
- Family: Nymphalidae
- Subfamily: Satyrinae
- Tribe: Satyrini; Boisduval, 1833

Subtribes
- Parargina Tutt, 1896; Lethina Reuter, 1896; Mycalesina Reuter, 1896; Eritina Miller, 1968; Ragadiina Herrich-Schäffer, 1864; Coenonymphina Tutt, 1896; Euptychiina Reuter, 1896; Erebiina Tutt, 1896; Maniolina Grote, 1897; Melanargiina Wheeler, 1903; Pronophilina Reuter, 1896; Satyrina Boisduval, 1833; Ypthimina Reuter, 1896; some genera incertae sedis

Diversity
- approximately 220 genera, 2200 species

= Satyrini =

Tribe of butterflies

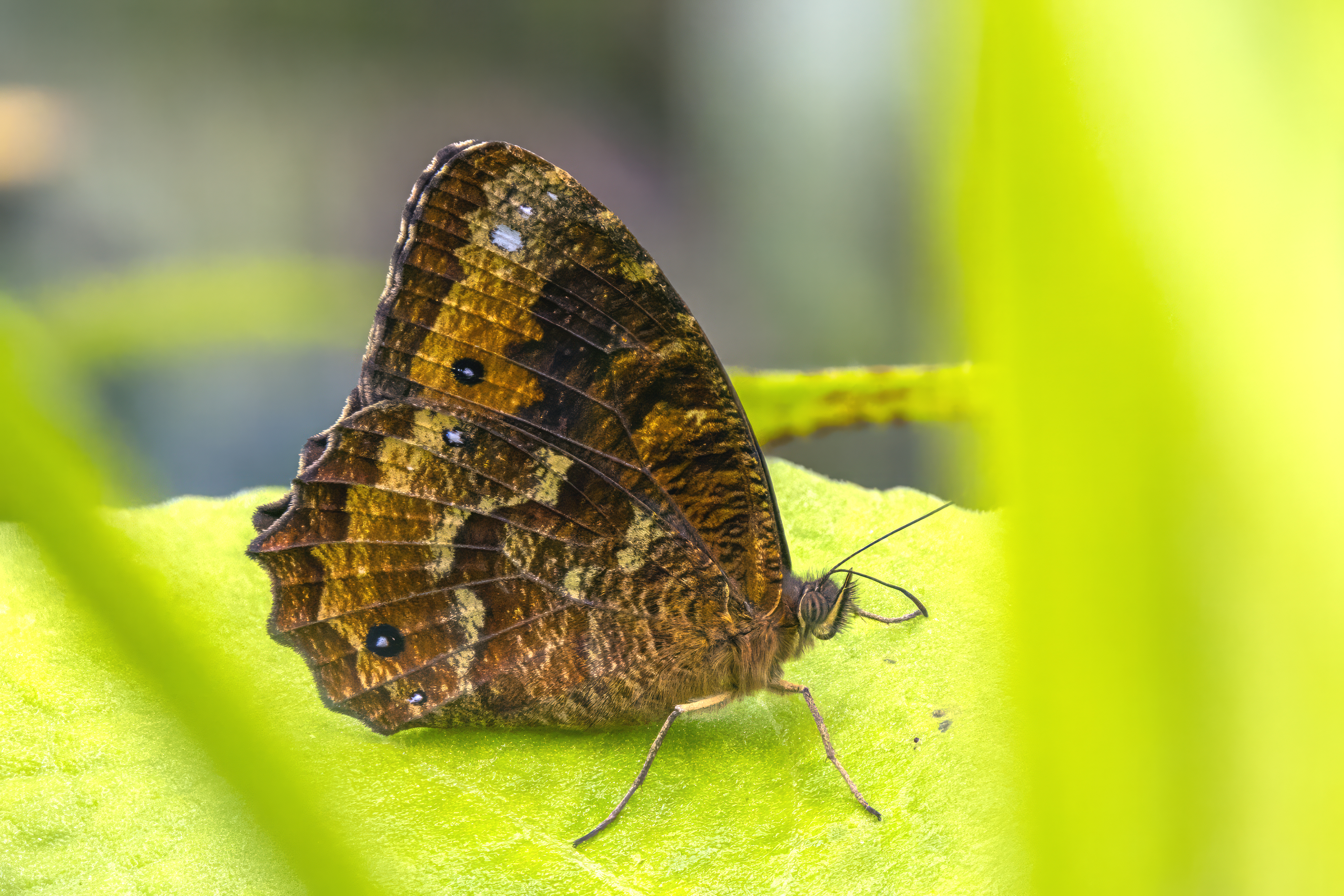
Toothed satyr Praepronophila petronius, Colombia

The Satyrini is one of the tribes of the subfamily Satyrinae. It includes about 2200 species and is therefore the largest tribe in the subfamily.

== Distribution ==
Satyrini butterflies have a worldwide distribution, but the distribution pattern differs between subtribes. Some subtribes are almost restricted to a single biogeographic region, such as the Pronophilina, which is found only in Andean cloud forests from Venezuela to Bolivia.

== Biology ==
The larval food plants of many species in this tribe are grasses, i.e. Poaceae. It is considered that the Satyrini diversified at about the same time as the grasses did, and that the radiation of the tribe is therefore closely related to the evolution of the grasses.

In contrast, the tribe has a few genera which show uncommon feeding preferences. Three genera, Euptychia, Ragadia and Acrophtalmia, feed on Lycopsida, and moreover, some species of Euptychia have been reported to feed on mosses of Neckeraceae. This is interesting cases as these genera are not considered to be very closely related to each other.

== Taxonomy ==
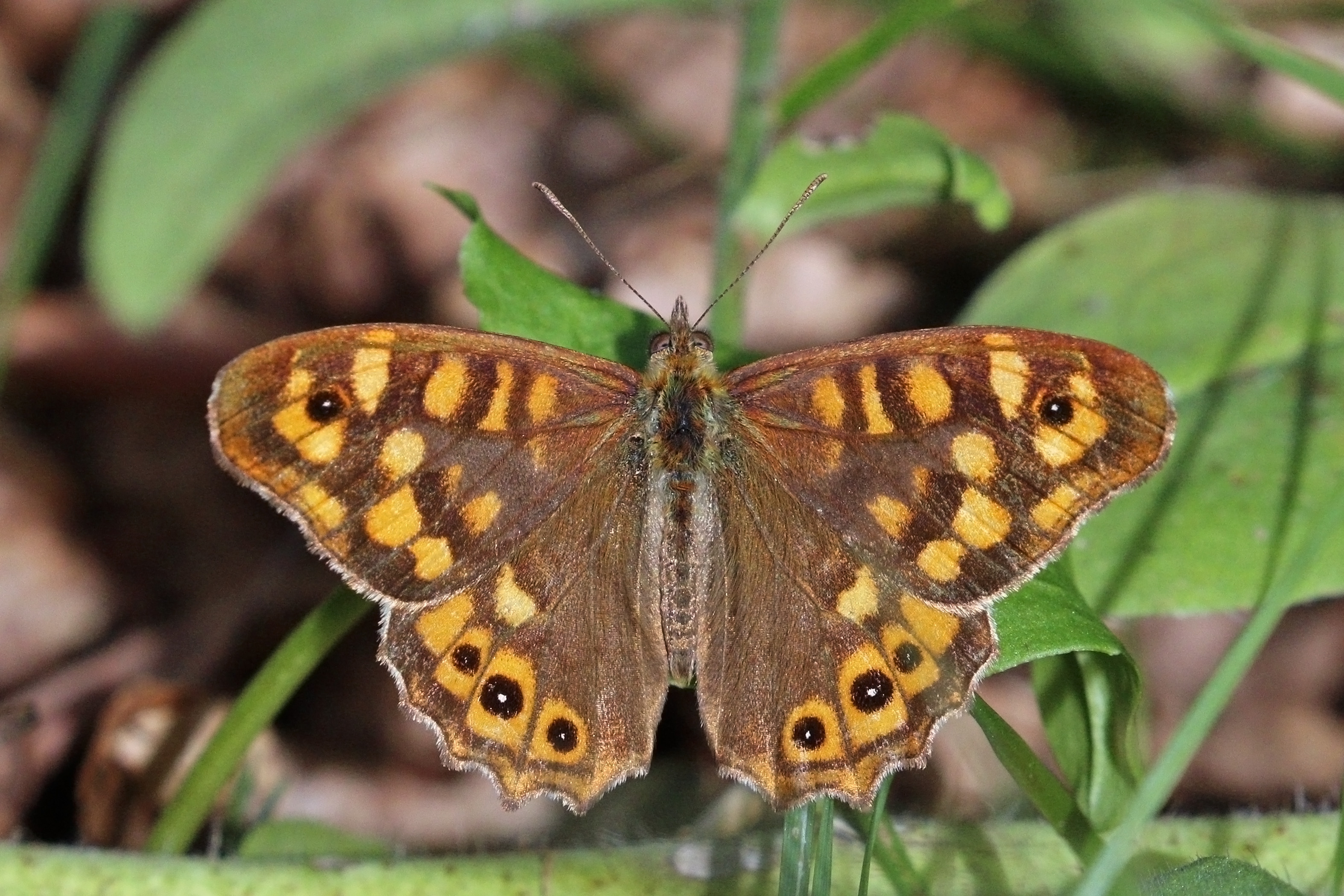
Pararge aegeria ♂, Portugal

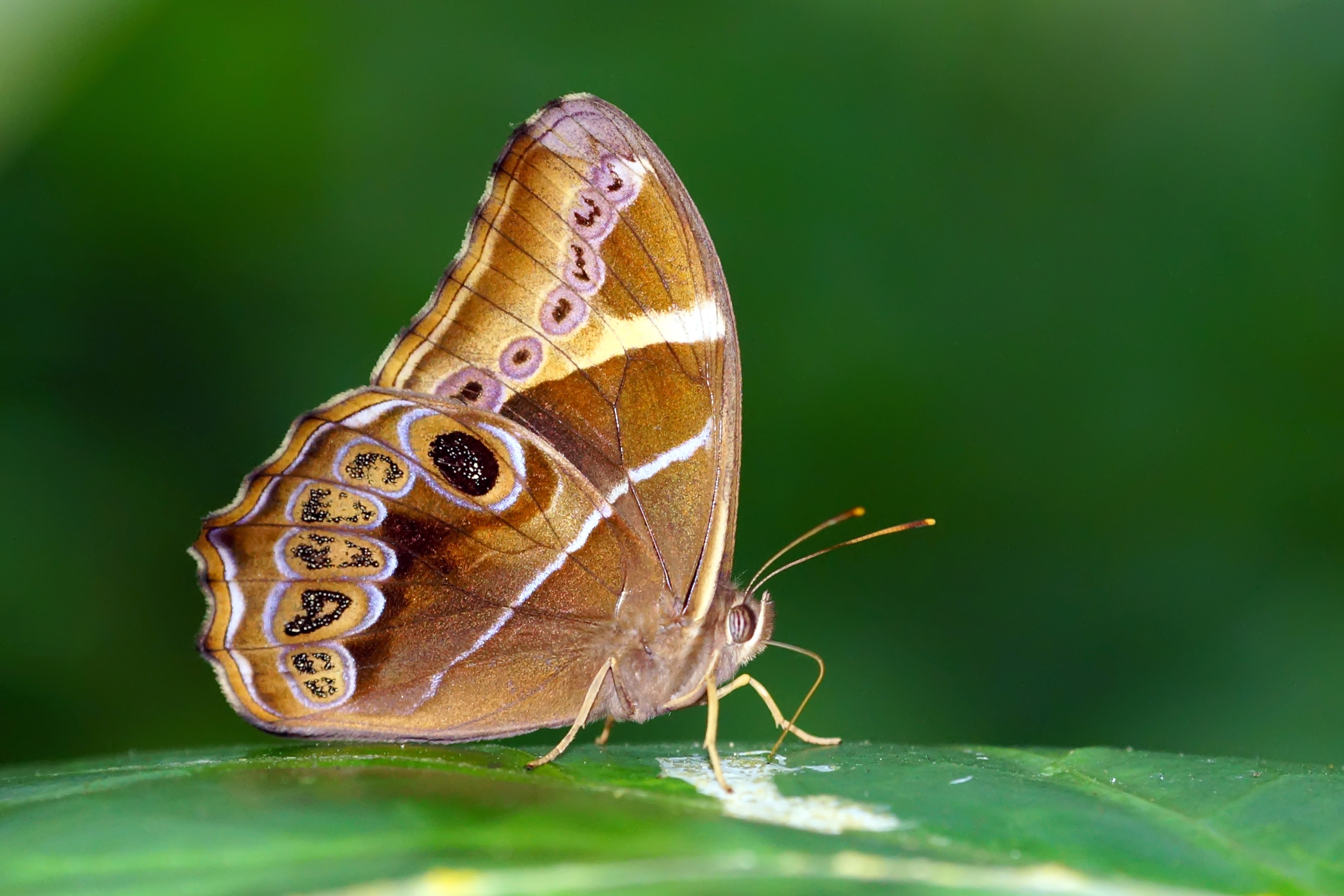
Lethe europa pavida, Taiwan

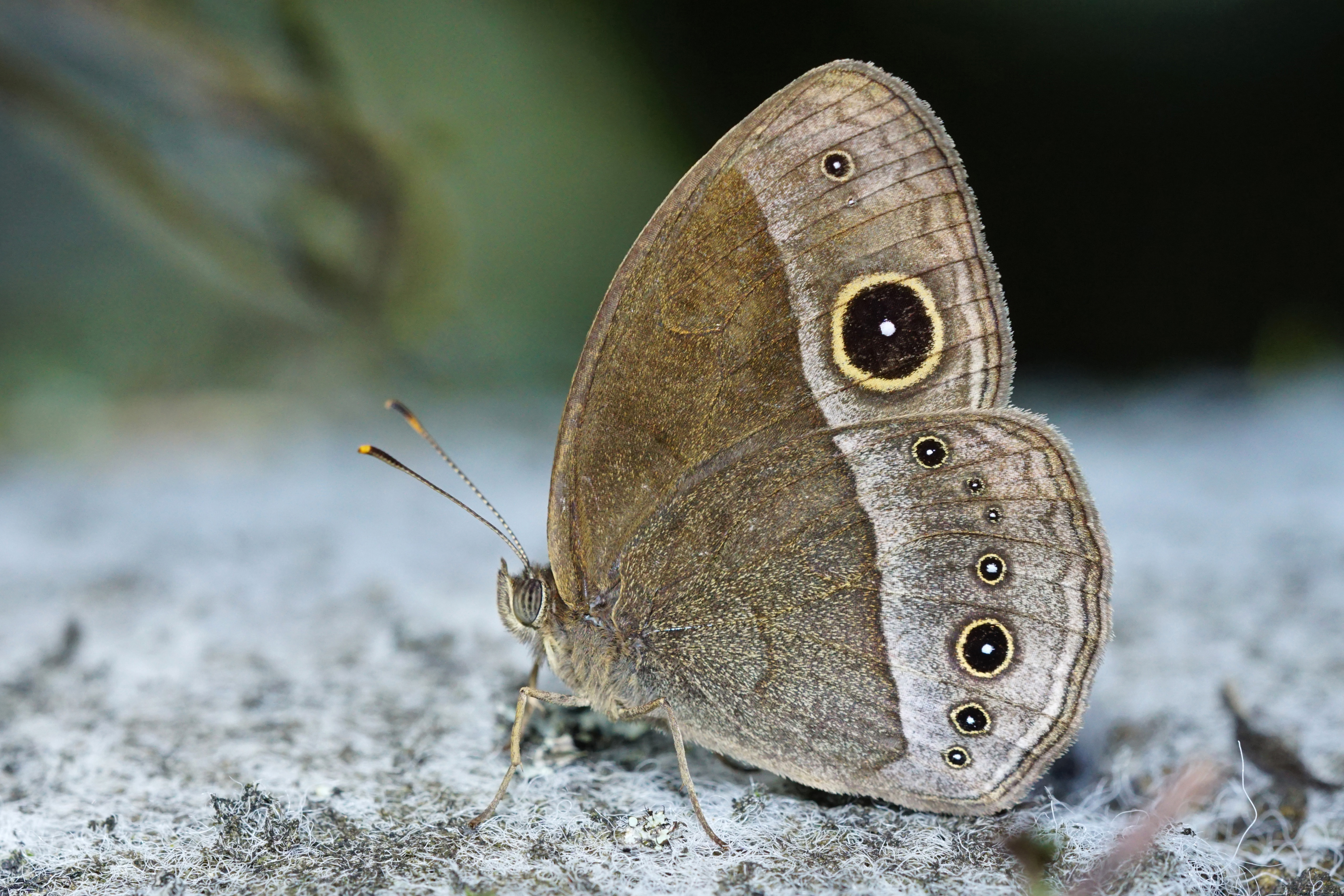
Mycalesis francisca formosana, Taiwan

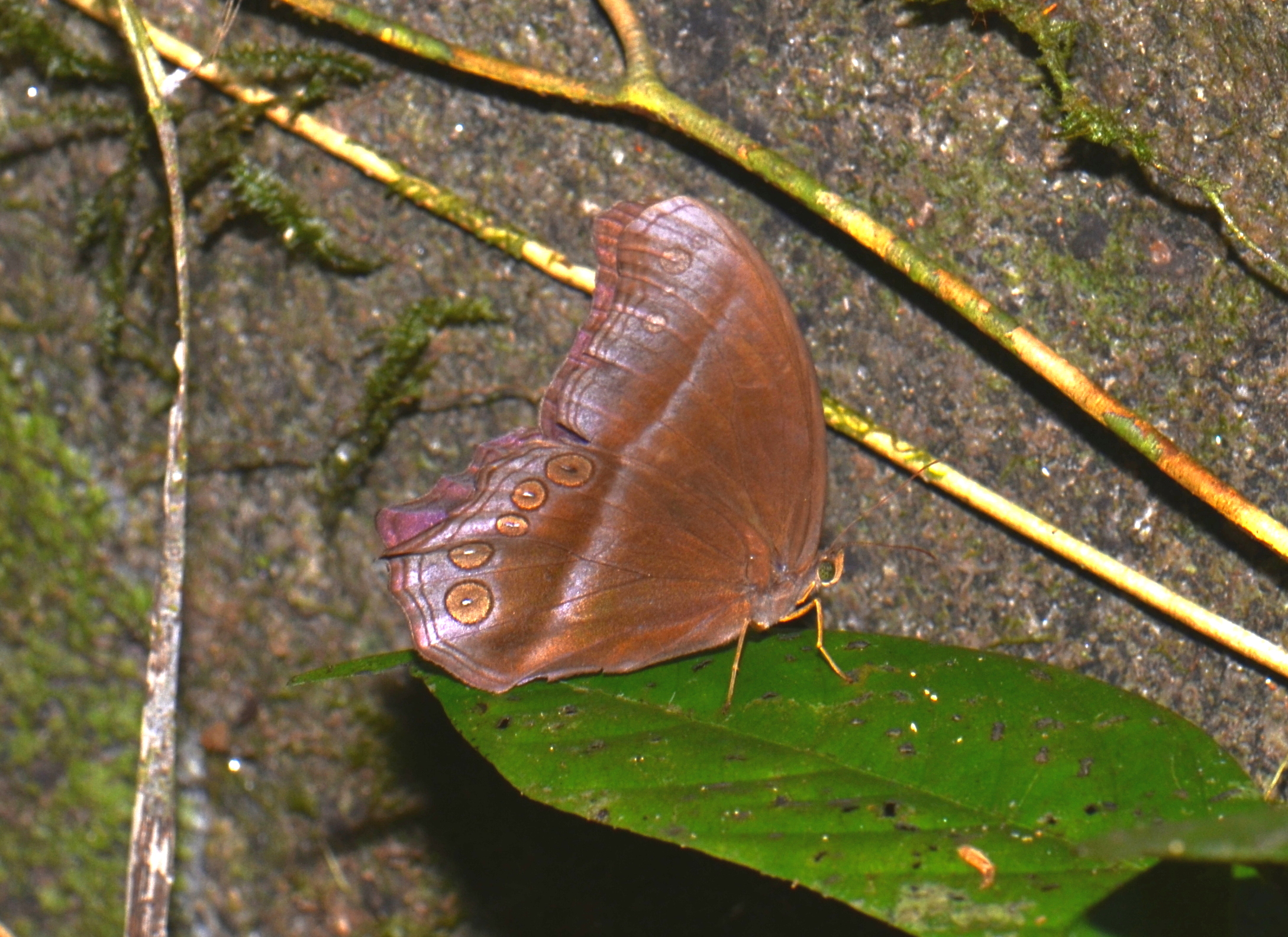
Coelites epiminthia, Malaysia

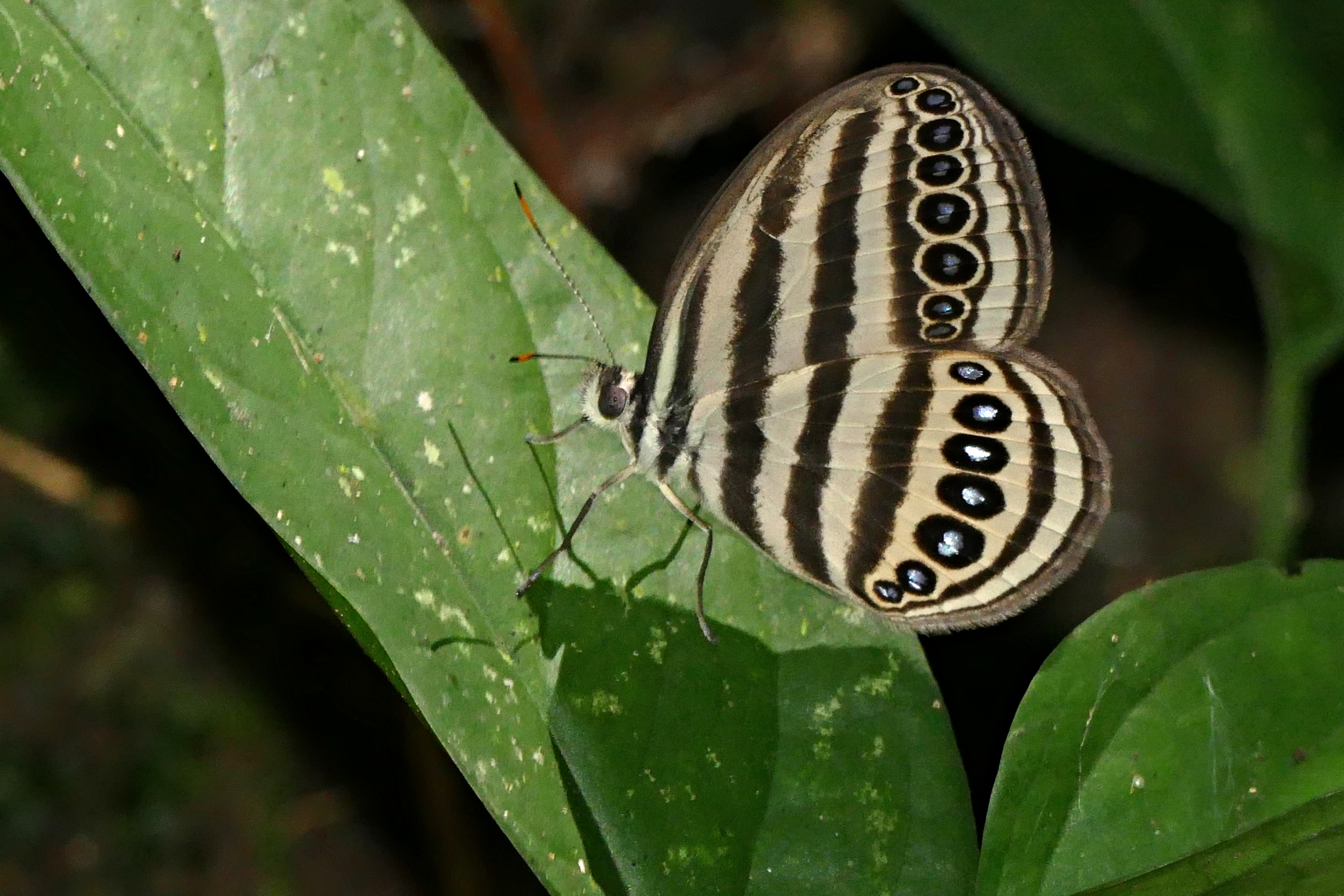
Ragadia makuta, Malaysia

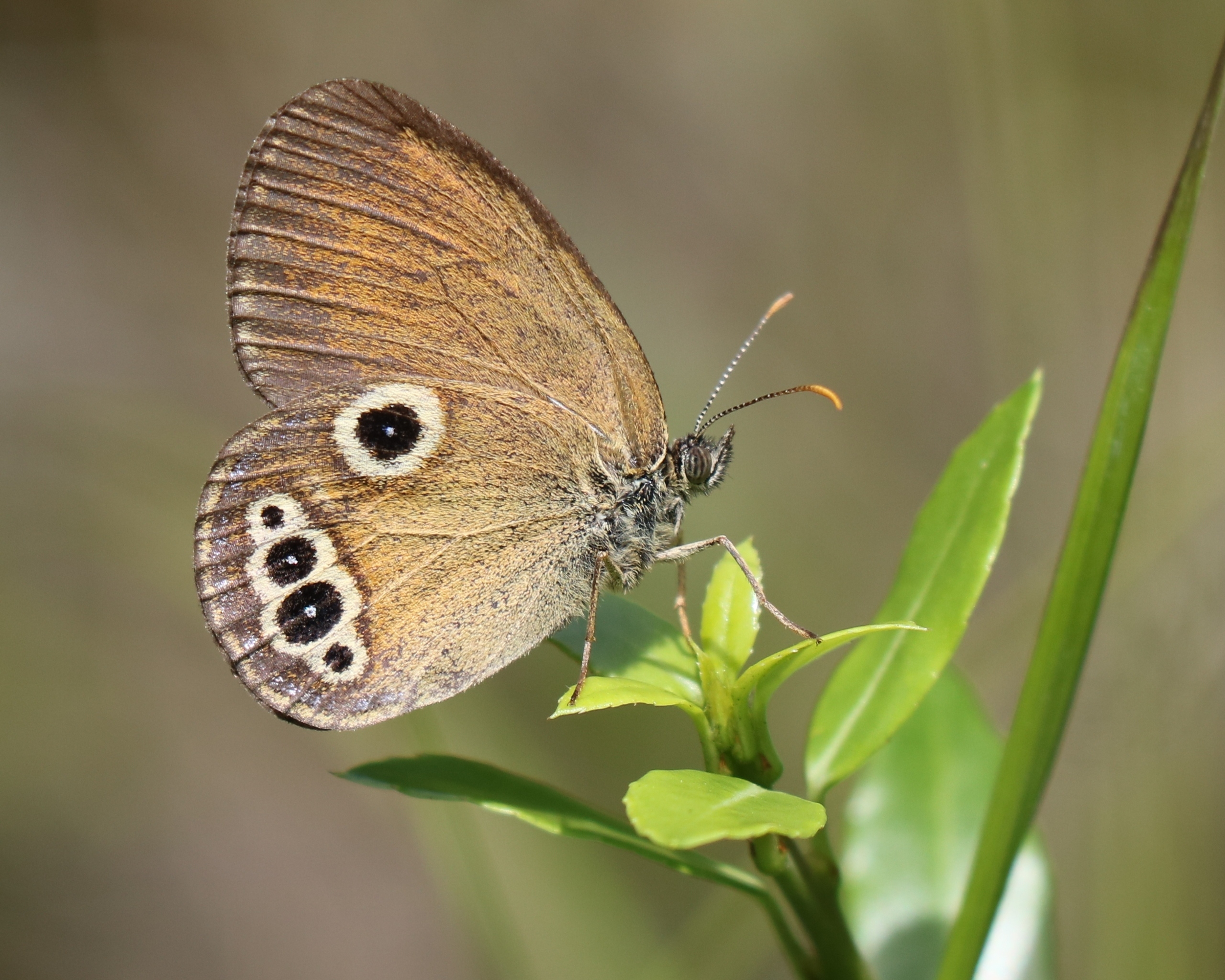
Coenonympha oedippus, Japan

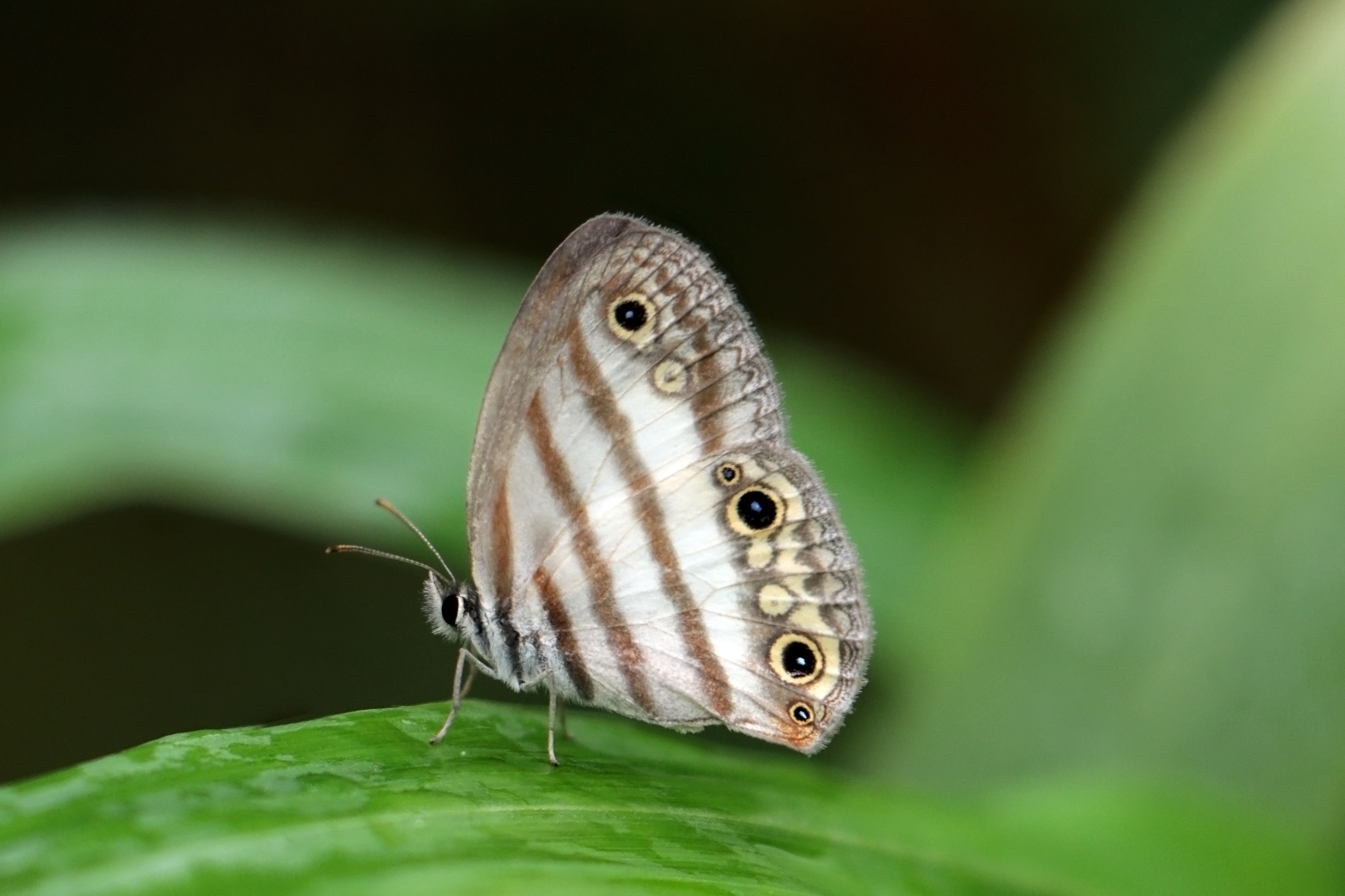
Euptychia westwoodi, Panama

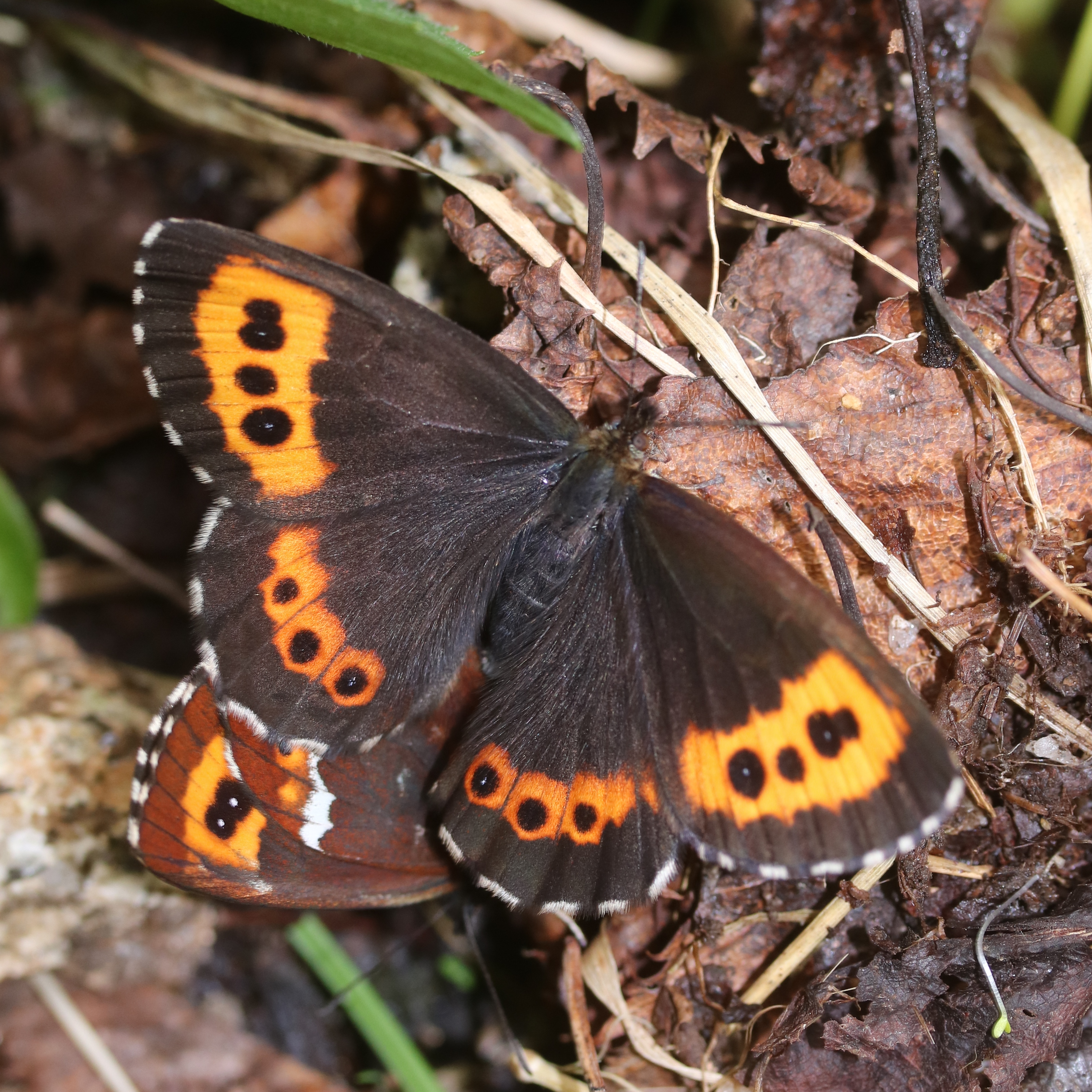
Erebia ligea takanonis, Japan

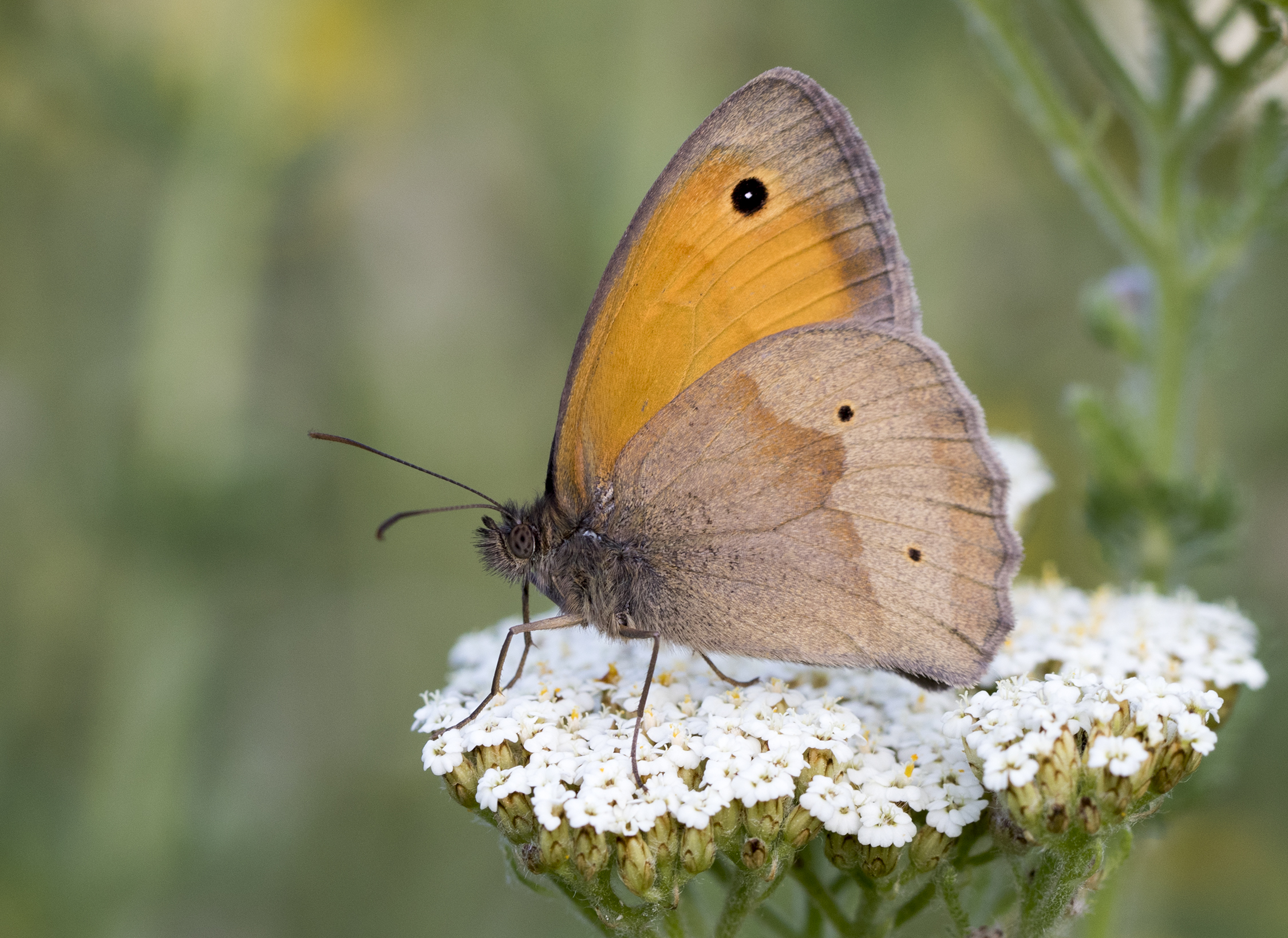
Maniola telmessia, Turkey

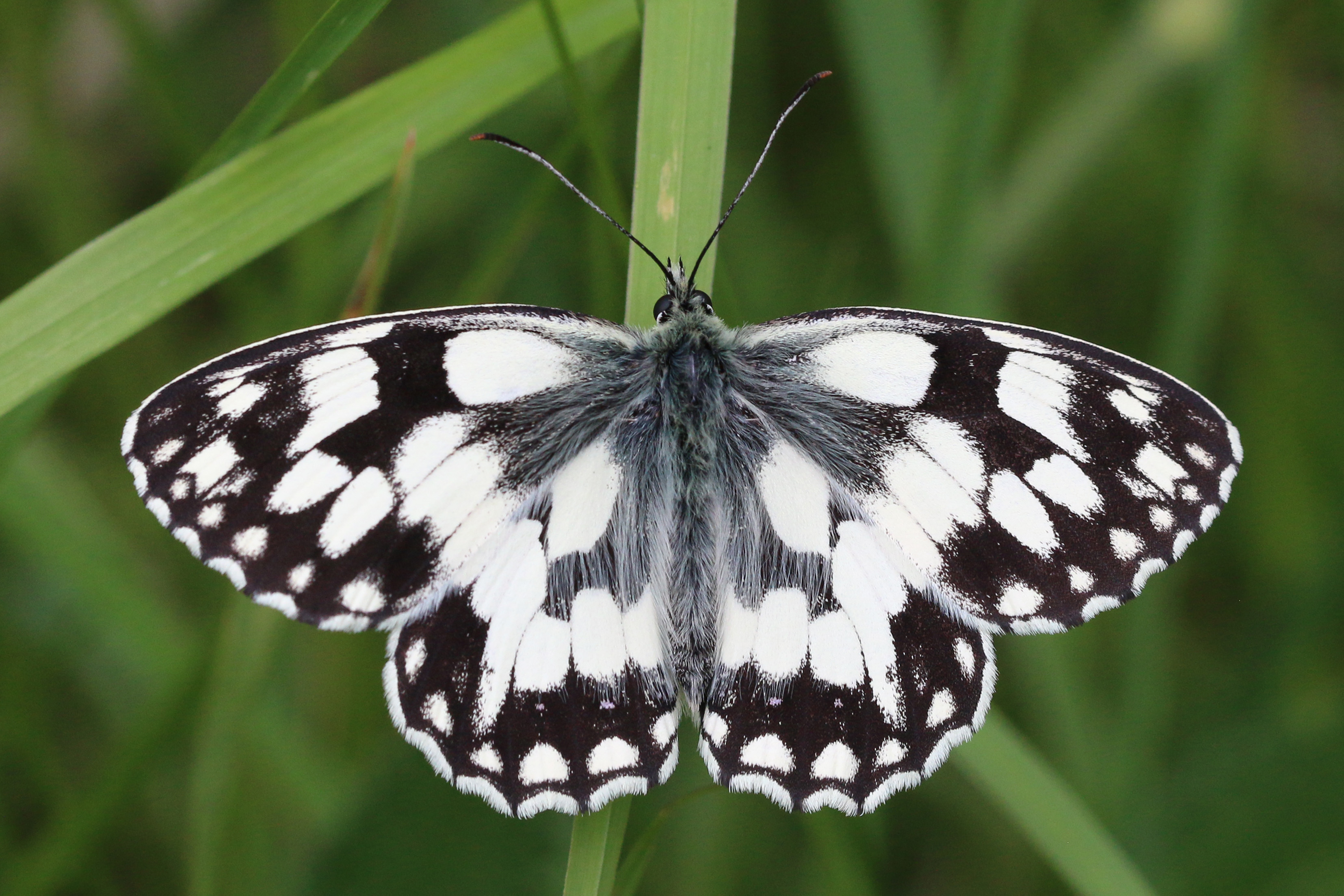
Melanargia galathea, UK

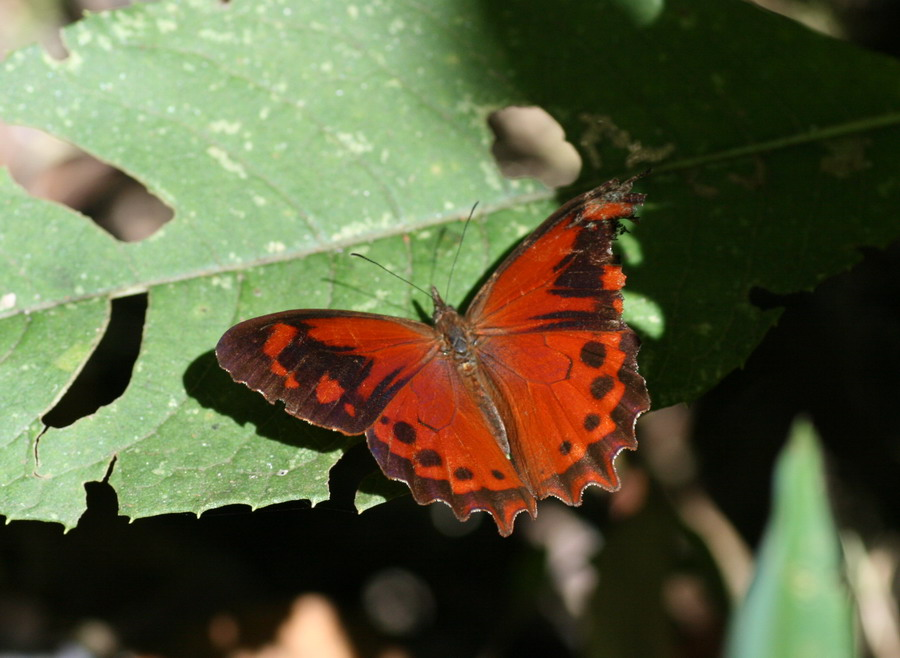
Lasiophila sp., Peru

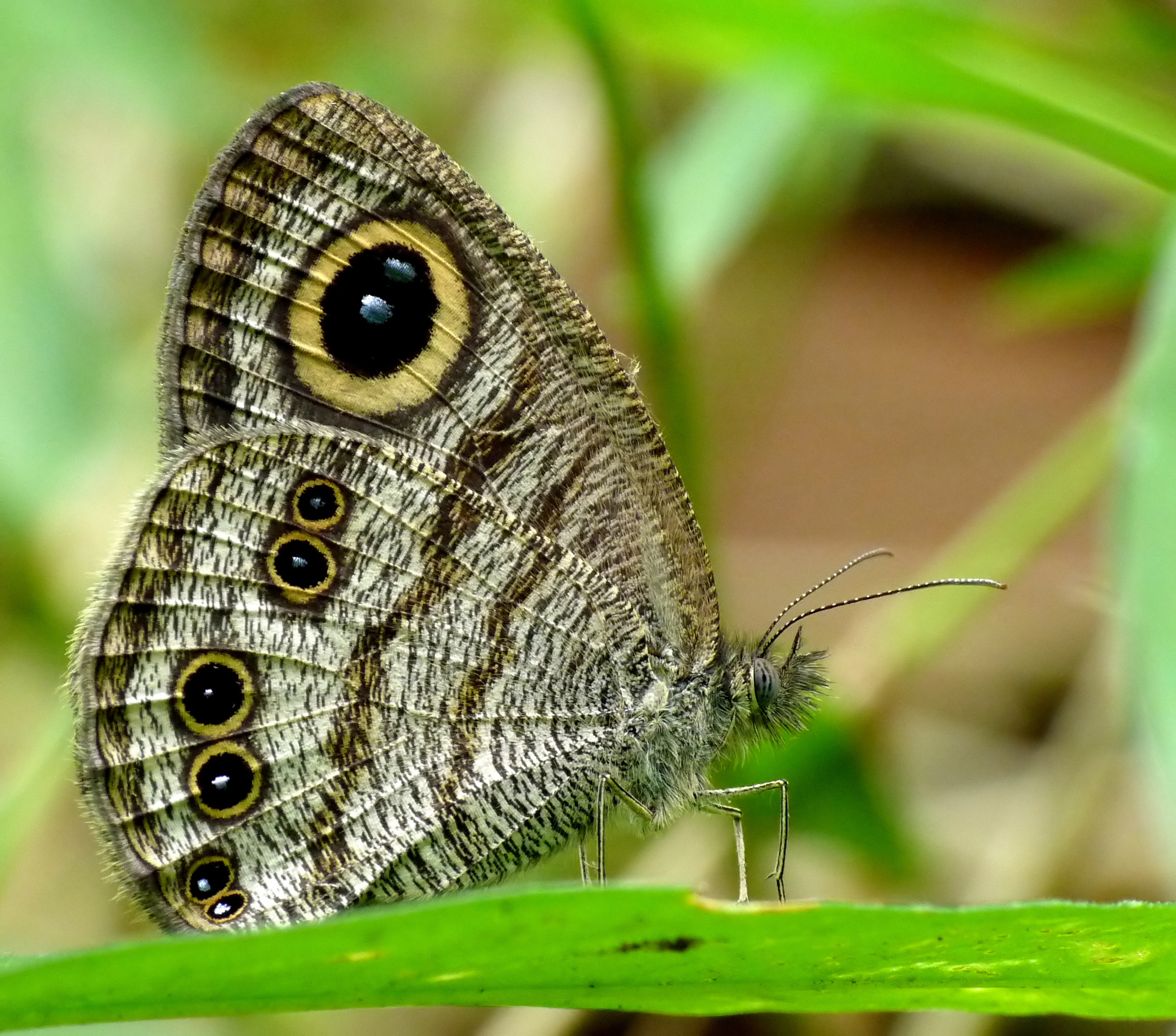
Ypthima baldus, India

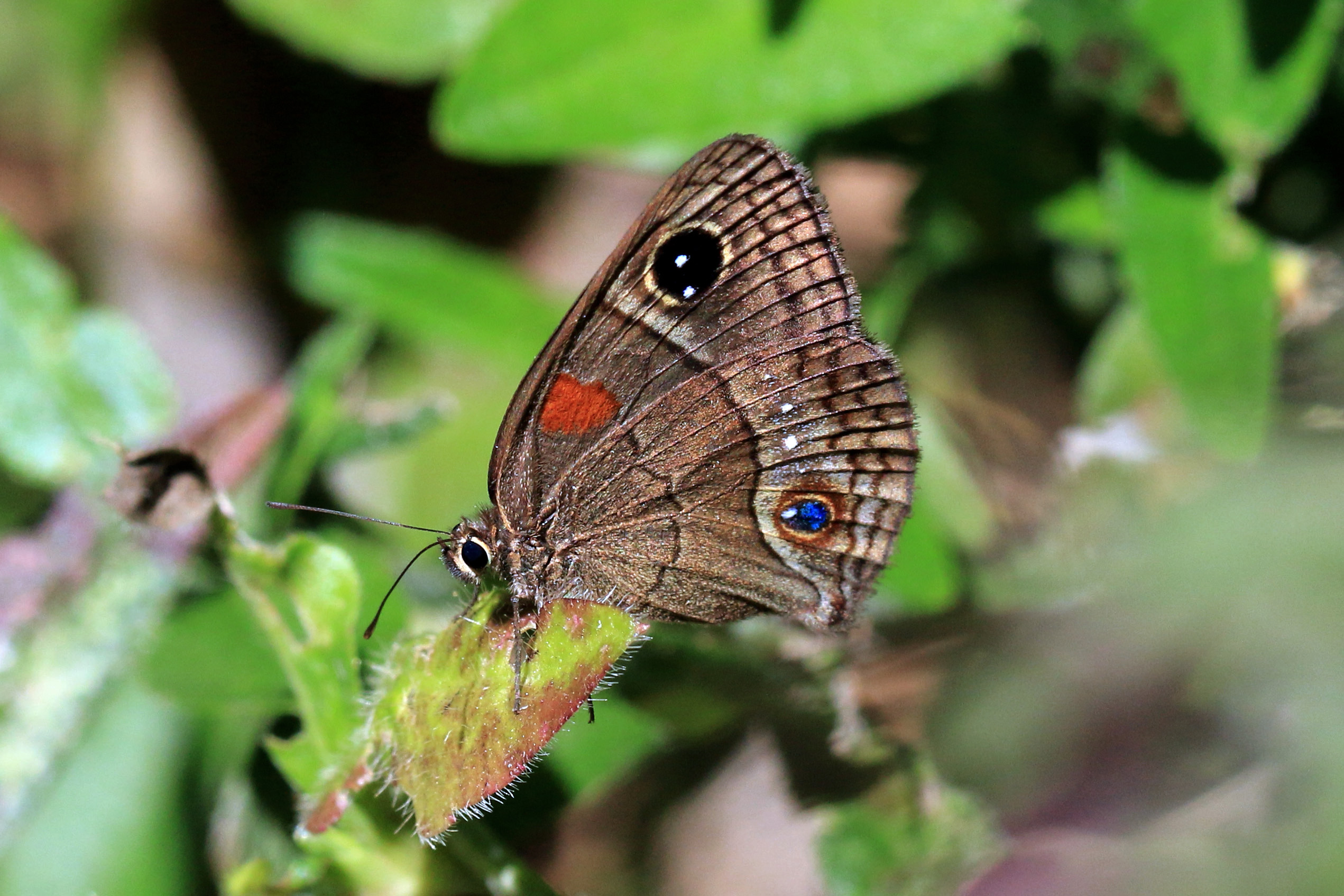
Calisto herophile, Cuba

The taxonomy of the subfamily Satyrinae has recently undergone a significant revision. Peña et al. (2006) showed that most of the traditionally well known group are paraphyletic or polyphyletic and developed a new taxonomy, based on molecular phylogenetic. The classification scheme transferred many genera traditionally placed in the Elymniini to the Satyrini, and later studies have largely followed this classification. Thus, the Satyrini is now considered to include the genera previously placed in the Elymniini, such as Lethe, Pararge and Mycalesis. However, the phylogenetic statuses of some subtribes within the tribe are still unclear and the revision of the classification is likely to continue.

According to Wahlberg (2019), the Satyrini includes the following subtribes and genera:

Parargina Moore, 1893
- Chonala Moore, 1893
- Kirinia Westwood, 1841
- Lasiommata Tutt, 1896
- Lopinga Moore, 1893
- Orinoma Gray, 1846
- Pararge Hübner, 1819
- Rhaphicera Butler, 1867
- Tatinga Moore, 1893
- Nosea Koiwaya 1993
Lethina Reuter, 1896
- Aphysoneura Karsch, 1894
- Lethe Hübner, 1819
- Neope Moore, 1866
- Ninguta Moore, 1892
- Ptychandra Felder & Felder, 1861
- Mandarinia Leech, 1892
Mycalesina Reuter, 1896
- Lohora Moore, 1880
- Brakefieldia Aduse-Poku, Lees & Wahlberg, 2016
- Telinga Moore, 1880
- Heteropsis Westwood, 1850
- Culapa Moore, 1879
- Mydosama Moore, 1880
- Mycalesis Hübner, 1818
- Devyatkinia Monastyrskii & Uémura, 2016
- Hallelesis Condamin, 1961
- Bicyclus Kirby, 1871
Eritina Miller, 1968
- Coelites Westwood, 1850
- Erites Westwood, 1851
- Orsotriaena Wallengren, 1858
- Zipaetis Hewitson, 1863
Ragadiina Herrich-Schäffer, 1864
- Acrophtalmia Felder & Felder, 1861
- Acropolis Hemming, 1934
- Ragadia Westwood, 1851
Coenonymphina Tutt, 1896
- Coenonympha Hübner, 1819
- Sinonympha Lee, 1994
- Oressinoma Doubleday, 1849
- Altiapa Parsons, 1986
- Argynnina Butler, 1867
- Argyronympha Mathew, 1886
- Argyrophenga Doubleday, 1845
- Dodonidia Butler, 1884
- Erebiola Fereday, 1879
- Erycinidia Rothschild & Jordan, 1905
- Geitoneura Butler, 1867
- Harsiesis Fruhstorfer, 1911
- Heteronympha Wallengren, 1858
- Hyalodia Jordan, 1924
- Hypocysta Westwood, 1851
- Lamprolenis Godman & Salvin, 1881
- Nesoxenica Waterhouse & Lyell, 1914
- Oreixenica Waterhouse & Lyell, 1914
- Paratisiphone Watkins, 1928
- Percnodaimon Butler, 1876
- Platypthima Rothschild & Jordan, 1905
- Tisiphone Hübner, 1819
Euptychiina Reuter, 1896
- Euptychia Hübner, 1818
- Palaeonympha Butler, 1871
- Amphidecta Butler, 1867
- Archeuptychia Forster, 1964
- Amiga Nakahara, Willmott & Espeland, 2019
- Caeruleuptychia Forster, 1964
- Capronnieria Forster, 1964
- Cepheuptychia Forster, 1964
- Chloreuptychia Forster, 1964
- Cissia Doubleday, 1848
- Coeruleotaygetis Forster, 1964
- Cyllopsis Felder, 1869
- Erichthodes Forster, 1964
- Euptychoides Forster, 1964
- Forsterinaria Gray, 1973
- Graphita Nakahara, Marín & Barbosa 2016
- Godartiana Forster, 1964
- Harjesia Forster, 1964
- Hermeuptychia Forster, 1964
- Huberonympha Viloria & Costa, 2016
- Inbio Nakahara & Espeland, 2015
- Magneuptychia Forster, 1964
- Megeuptychia Forster, 1964
- Megisto Hübner, 1819
- Moneuptychia Forsterm, 1964
- Neonympha Hübner 1818
- Nhambikuara Freitas, Barbosa & Zacca, 2018
- Optimandes Marín, Nakahara & Willmott, 2019
- Orotaygetis Nakahara & Zacca, 2018
- Paramacera Butler, 1868
- Parataygetis Forster, 1964
- Pareuptychia Forster, 1964
- Paryphthimoides Forster, 1964
- Pharneuptychia Forster, 1964
- Pindis Felder, 1869
- Posttaygetis Forster, 1964
- Prenda Freitas & Mielke, 2011
- Pseudeuptychia Forster, 1964
- Pseudodebis Forster, 1964
- Rareuptychia Forster, 1964
- Satyrotaygetis Forster, 1964
- Sepona Freitas & Barbosa, 2016
- Splendeuptychia Forster, 1964
- Stegosatyrus Zacca, Mielke & Pyrcz, 2013
- Stevenaria Viloria, Costa, Neild & Nakahara, 2016
- Taydebis Freitas, 2003
- Taygetina Forster, 1964
- Taygetis Hübner, 1819
- Taygetomorpha Miller, 2004
- Yphthimoides Forster, 1964
- Zischkaia Forster, 1964
Erebiina Tutt, 1896
- Erebia Elwes, 1899
Maniolina Grote, 1897
- Aphantopus Wallengren, 1853
- Cercyonis Scudder, 1875
- Hyponephele Muschamp, 1915
- Maniola Schrank, 1801
- Pyronia Hübner, 1819
Melanargiina Wheeler, 1903
- Melanargia Meigen, 1828
Pronophilina Reuter, 1896
- Altopedaliodes Forster, 1964
- Antopedaliodes Forster, 1964
- Apexacuta Pyrcz, 2004
- Arhuaco Adams & Bernard, 1977
- Cheimas Thieme, 1907
- Corades Doubleday, 1849
- Corderopedaliodes Forster, 1964
- Daedalma Hewitson, 1858
- Dangond Adams & Bernard, 1979
- Drucina Butler, 1872
- Druphila Pyrcz, 2004
- Eretris Thieme, 1905
- Eteona Doubleday, 1848
- Foetterleia Viloria, 2004
- Junea Hemming, 1964
- Lasiophila Felder & Felder, 1859
- Lymanopoda Westwood, 1851
- Mygona Thieme, 1907
- Neopedaliodes Viloria, Miller & Miller 2004
- Oxeoschistus Butler, 1867
- Panyapedaliodes Forster, 1964
- Paramo Adams & Bernard, 1977
- Parapedaliodes Forster, 1964
- Pedaliodes Butler, 1867
- Pherepedaliodes Forster, 1964
- Physcopedaliodes Forster, 1964
- Praepedaliodes Forster, 1964
- Praepronophila Forster, 1964
- Proboscis Thieme, 1907
- Pronophila Doubleday, 1849
- Protopedaliodes Viloria & Pyrcz, 1994
- Pseudomaniola Röber, 1889
- Punapedaliodes Forster, 1964
- Steremnia Thieme, 1905
- Steroma Westwood, 1850
- Steromapedaliodes Forster, 1964
- Thiemeia Weymer, 1912
- Diaphanos Adams & Bernard, 1981
- Ianussiusa Pyrcz & Viloria, 2004
- Idioneurula Strand, 1932
- Manerebia Staudinger, 1897
- Neomaniola Hayward, 1949
- Argyrophorus Blanchard, 1852
- Auca Hayward, 1953
- Chillanella Herrera, 1966
- Cosmosatyrus Felder & Felder, 1867
- Elina Blanchard, 1852
- Faunula Felder & Felder, 1867
- Haywardella Herrera, 1966
- Homoeonympha Felder & Felder, 1867
- Nelia Hayward, 1953
- Neomaenas Wallengren, 1858
- Neosatyrus Wallengren, 1858
- Pampasatyrus Hayward, 1953
- Quilaphoestosus Herrera, 1966
- Spinantenna Hayward, 1953
- Tetraphlebia Felder & Felder, 1867
- Gyrocheilus Butler, 1867
Satyrina Boisduval, 1833
- Argestina Riley, 1923
- Davidina Oberthür, 1879
- Berberia de Lesse, 1951
- Hipparchia Fabricius, 1807
- Kanetisa Moore, 1893
- Aulocera Butler, 1867
- Karanasa Moore, 1893
- Oeneis Hübner, 1819
- Paroeneis Moore, 1893
- Arethusana de Lesse, 1951
- Brintesia Fruhstorfer, 1911
- Minois Hübner, 1819
- Chazara Moore, 1893
- Pseudochazara de Lesse, 1951
- Satyrus Latreille, 1810
Ypthimina Reuter, 1896
- Cassionympha van Son, 1955
- Coenyra Hewitson, 1865
- Coenyropsis van Son, 1958
- Mashuna van Son, 1955
- Mashunoides Mendes & Bivar de Sousa, 2009
- Melampias Hübner, 1819
- Neita van Son, 1955
- Neocoenyra Butler, 1886
- Pseudonympha Wallengren, 1857
- Paternympha Henning & Henning, 1997
- Physcaeneura Wallengren, 1857
- Strabena Mabille, 1877
- Stygionympha van Son, 1955
- Ypthima Hübner, 1818
- Austroypthima Holloway, 1974
- Ypthimomorpha van Son, 1955
subtribe uncertain
- Calisto Hübner, 1823
- Paralasa Moore, 1893
- Callerebia Butler, 1867
- Proterebia Roos & Amschied, 1980
- Loxerebia Watkins, 1925
- Dyndirus Capronnier, 1874

Table for representative higher level classifications of satyrines in Peña et al. (2006) (excerpts with some modifications (Note: Lamas (2004) was excluded because it only listed genera distributed in the Neotropics. Also, note that the table does not include all subtribes of this tribe (e.g. there are not subtribes Eritina, Ragadiina and tribe Dirini), and some genera have been further reclassified (e.g. Aeropetes and Paralethe from Melanitini to Dirini, Orsotriaena and Zipaetis from Coenonymphina to Eritina) or synonymized (e.g. Satyrodes was synonymized with Lethe), since Peña et al. (2006).))
	Miller (1968)		Harvey (1991)	Peña et al. (2006)
Family	Satyridae	Subfamily	Satyrinae	Satyrinae
Subfamily	Elymniinae	Tribe	Elymniini	Elymniini
Tribe	Elymniini	Subtribe	Elymniiti	Elymnias
Genera	Elymnias; Elymniopsis	Genera	Elymnias; Elymniopsis	Elymnias
Tribe	Lethini	Subtribe	Lethiti	Elymnias
Genera	Aeropetes; Paralethe; Enodia; Lethe; Neope; Satyrodes; Kirinia; Lasiommata; Lopinga; Pararge; Ethope; Neorina	Genera	Aeropetes; Paralethe; Enodia; Lethe; Neope; Satyrodes; Kirinia; Lasiommata; Lopinga; Pararge; Ethope; Neorina	Elymnias
Tribe	Mycalesini	Subtribe	Mycalesiti	Elymnias
Genera	Bicyclus; Hallelesis; Henotesia; Mycalesis; Orsotriaena	Genera	Bicyclus; Hallelesis; Henotesia; Mycalesis; Orsotriaena	Elymnias
Tribe	Zetherini	Subtribe	Zetheriti	Elymnias
Genus	Zethera		Zethera	Elymnias
Genus	Zethera	Tribe	Zethera	Zetherini
Genus	Zethera	Genera	Zethera	Neorina; Penthema; Ethope; Zethera
Subfamily	Biinae	Tribe	Biini	Melanitini
Tribe	Melanitini	Subtribe	Melanititi	Aeropetes; Paralethe; Manataria; Gnophodes; Melanitis
Genera	Gnophodes; Melanitis	Genera	Gnophodes; Melanitis	Aeropetes; Paralethe; Manataria; Gnophodes; Melanitis
Tribe	tribe uncertain	Tribe	tribe uncertain	Aeropetes; Paralethe; Manataria; Gnophodes; Melanitis
Genus	Manataria	Genera	Manataria	Aeropetes; Paralethe; Manataria; Gnophodes; Melanitis
Subfamily	Haeterinae	Tribe	Haeterini	Haeterini
Tribe	Haeterini	Genera	Cithaerias; Haetera; Pierella; Pseudohaetera	Cithaerias; Haetera; Pierella; Pseudohaetera
Genera	Cithaerias; Haetera; Pierella; Pseudohaetera	Genera	Cithaerias; Haetera; Pierella; Pseudohaetera	Cithaerias; Haetera; Pierella; Pseudohaetera
Subfamily	Satyrinae	Tribe	Satyrini	Satyrini
		Subtribe		Parargina
		Genera		Kirinia; Lopinga; Lasiommata; Pararge
		Subtribe		Lethina
		Genera		Lethe; Enodia; Satyrodes; Neope
		Subtribe		Mycalesina
		Genera		Bicyclus; Hallelesis; Henotesia; Mycalesis
Tribe	Coenonymphini	Subtribe	Coenonymphiti	Coenonymphina
Genera	Coenonympha; Aphantopus	Genera	Coenonympha; Aphantopus	Oreixenica; Tisiphone; Nesoxenica; Hypocysta; Lamprolenis; Dodonidia; Argyrophenga; Erebiola; Percnodaimon; Heteronympha; Geitoneura; Oressinoma; Coenonympha; Orsotriaena; Zipaetis; Argyronympha
Tribe	Hypocystini	Subtribe	Hypocystiti	Oreixenica; Tisiphone; Nesoxenica; Hypocysta; Lamprolenis; Dodonidia; Argyrophenga; Erebiola; Percnodaimon; Heteronympha; Geitoneura; Oressinoma; Coenonympha; Orsotriaena; Zipaetis; Argyronympha
Genera	Argyrophenga; Dodonidia; Erebiola; Geitoneura; Heteronympha; Hypocysta; Lamprolenis; Nesoxenica; Oreixenica; Percnodaimon; Tisiphone; Zipaetis	Genera	Argyrophenga; Dodonidia; Erebiola; Geitoneura; Heteronympha; Hypocysta; Lamprolenis; Nesoxenica; Oreixenica; Percnodaimon; Tisiphone; Zipaetis	Oreixenica; Tisiphone; Nesoxenica; Hypocysta; Lamprolenis; Dodonidia; Argyrophenga; Erebiola; Percnodaimon; Heteronympha; Geitoneura; Oressinoma; Coenonympha; Orsotriaena; Zipaetis; Argyronympha
Tribe	Euptychiini	Subtribe	Euptychiiti	Euptychiina
Genera	Caeruleuptychia; Cepheuptychia; Chloreuptychia; Cissia; Cyllopsis; Erichthodes; Euptychia; Euptychoides; Forsterinaria; Godartiana; Harjesia; Hermeuptychia; Moneuptychia; Neonympha; Oressinoma; Paramacera; Parataygetis; Pareuptychia; Paryphthimoides; Pharneuptychia; Pindis; Posttaygetis; Oressinoma; Rareuptychia; Splendeuptychia; Taygetis; Yphthimoides	Genera	Caeruleuptychia; Cepheuptychia; Chloreuptychia; Cissia; Cyllopsis; Erichthodes; Euptychia; Euptychoides; Forsterinaria; Godartiana; Harjesia; Hermeuptychia; Moneuptychia; Neonympha; Oressinoma; Paramacera; Parataygetis; Pareuptychia; Paryphthimoides; Pharneuptychia; Pindis; Posttaygetis; Oressinoma; Rareuptychia; Splendeuptychia; Taygetis; Yphthimoides	Euptychia; Cyllopsis; Paramacera; Palaeonympha; Pharneuptychia; Euptychoides; Yphthimoides; Moneuptychia; Paryphthimoides; Amphidecta; Rareuptychia; Godartiana; Hermeuptychia; Splendeuptychia; Pindis; Cepheuptychia; Cissia; Caeruleuptychia; Magneuptychia; Chloreuptychia; Neonympha; Erichthodes; Pareuptychia; Taygetis; Harjesia; Parataygetis; Posttaygetis; Forsterinaria
Tribe	tribe uncertain	Subtribe	subtribe uncertain	subtribe uncertain
Genus	Palaeonympha	Genera	Palaeonympha	Cercyonis; Hyponephele; Neocoenyra
Tribe	Ypthimini	Subtribe	Ypthimiti	Ypthimina
Genera	Neocoenyra; Ypthima; Ypthimomorpha	Genera	Neocoenyra; Ypthima; Ypthimomorpha	Paralasa; Ypthima; Ypthimomorpha
Tribe	Melanargiini	Subtribe	Melanargiiti	Melanargiina
Genus	Melanargia	Genus	Melanargia	Melanargia
Tribe	Maniolini	Subtribe	Manioliti	Maniolina
Genera	Cercyonis; Hyponephele; Maniola; Pyronia	Genera	Cercyonis; Hyponephele; Maniola; Pyronia	Pyronia; Maniola; Aphantopus
Tribe	Pronophilini	Subtribe	Pronophiliti	Pronophilina
Genera	Amphidecta; Corades; Daedalma; Eteona; Junea; Lasiophila; Lymanopoda; Oxeoschistus; Panyapedaliodes; Parapedaliodes; Pedaliodes; Praepedaliodes; Proboscis; Pronophila; Pseudomaniola; Punapedaliodes; Steremnia; Steroma; Idioneurula; Manerebia; Argyrophorus; Quilaphoetosus; Auca; Chillanella; Cosmosatyrus; Elina; Etcheverrius; Nelia; Pampasatyrus	Genera	Amphidecta; Corades; Daedalma; Eteona; Junea; Lasiophila; Lymanopoda; Oxeoschistus; Panyapedaliodes; Parapedaliodes; Pedaliodes; Praepedaliodes; Proboscis; Pronophila; Pseudomaniola; Punapedaliodes; Steremnia; Steroma; Idioneurula; Manerebia; Argyrophorus; Quilaphoetosus; Auca; Chillanella; Cosmosatyrus; Elina; Etcheverrius; Nelia; Pampasatyrus	Nelia; Steremnia; Steroma; Manerebia; Idioneurula; Tamania; Ianussiusa; Lymanopoda; Argyrophorus; Etcheverrius; Pampasatyrus; Elina; Quilaphoetosus; Cosmosatyrus; Chillanella; Auca; Panyapedaliodes; Pedaliodes; Punapedaliodes; Praepedaliodes; Corades; Junea; Pronophila; Eteona; Foetterleia; Daedalma; Oxeoschistus; Proboscis; Lasiophila; Apexacuta; Pseudomaniola
Tribe	Erebiini	Subtribe	Erebiiti	Erebiina
Genus	Erebia	Genus	Erebia	Erebia
Tribe	Satyrini	Subtribe	Satyriti	Satyrina
Genera	Arethusana; Berberia; Brintesia; Chazara; Hipparchia; Karanasa; Neominois; Oeneis; Paralasa; Pseudochazara; Satyrus	Genera	Arethusana; Berberia; Brintesia; Chazara; Hipparchia; Karanasa; Neominois; Oeneis; Paralasa; Pseudochazara; Satyrus	Berberia; Hipparchia; Chazara; Pseudochazara; Satyrus; Arethusana; Brintesia; Karanasa; Neominois; Oeneis
		Tribe	tribe uncertain	
		Genera	Penthema	
