= Arhuaco (disambiguation) =

The Arhuaco are an indigenous people of Colombia.

Arhuaco may also refer to:

- Arhuaco language
- Arhuaco (genus), a butterfly genus in the family Nymphalidae
