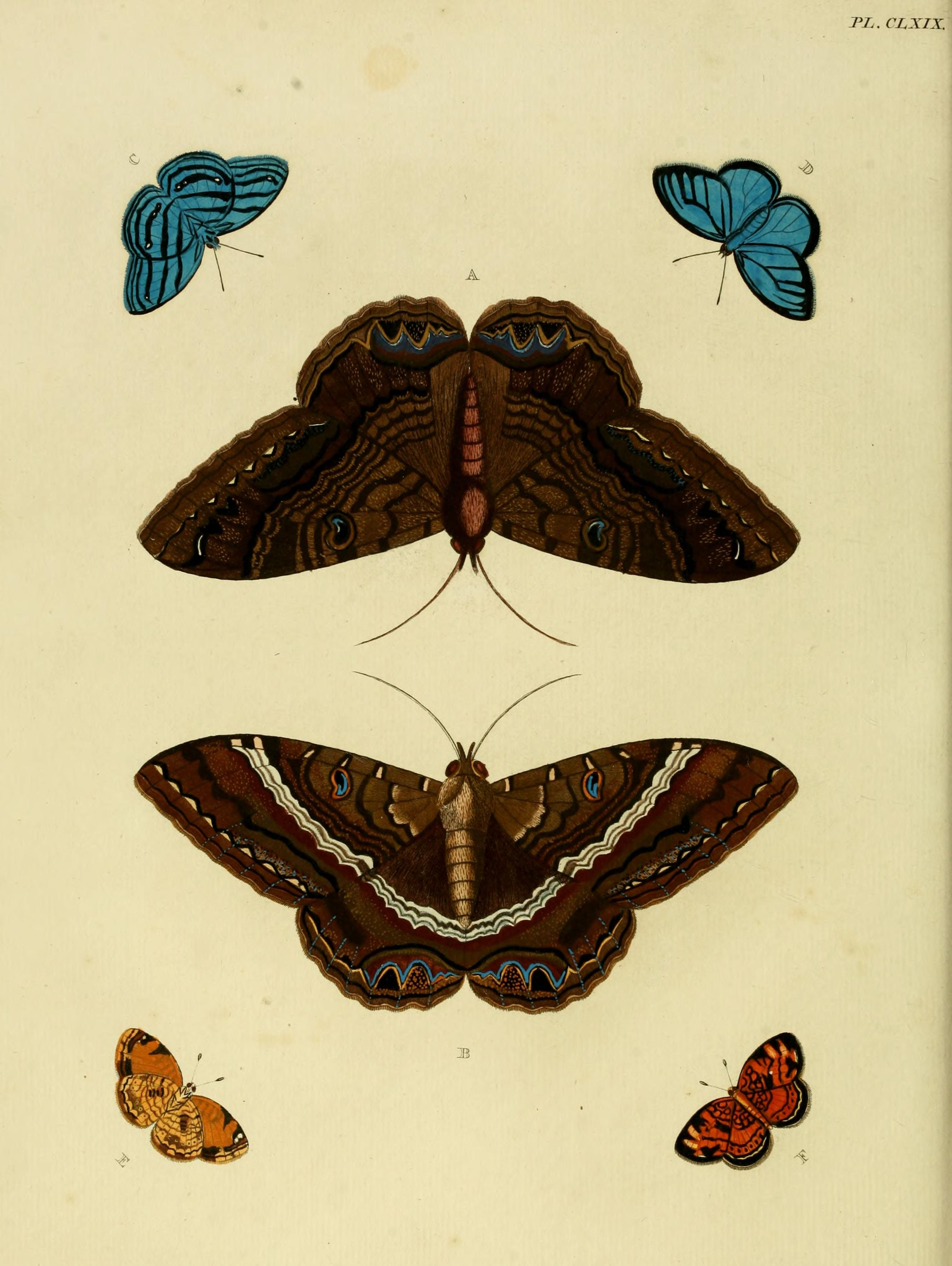
- Figures C and D, Cepheuptychia cephus

Scientific classification
- Kingdom: Animalia
- Phylum: Arthropoda
- Class: Insecta
- Order: Lepidoptera
- Family: Nymphalidae
- Subfamily: Satyrinae
- Tribe: Satyrini
- Subtribe: Euptychiina
- Genus: Cepheuptychia; Forster, 1964

= Cepheuptychia =

Genus of butterflies

Cepheuptychia is a genus of satyrid butterfly found in the Neotropical realm.

== Species ==
Listed alphabetically:

- Cepheuptychia angelica (Butler, 1874)
- Cepheuptychia cephus (Fabricius, 1775)
- Cepheuptychia glaucina (Bates, 1865)
- Cepheuptychia romani (Aurivillius, 1929)
