= Godartiana =

Scientific classification
- Kingdom: Animalia
- Phylum: Arthropoda
- Class: Insecta
- Order: Lepidoptera
- Family: Nymphalidae
- Subfamily: Satyrinae
- Tribe: Satyrini
- Subtribe: Euptychiina
- Genus: Godartiana; Forster, 1964

Genus of butterflies

Godartiana is a genus of satyrid butterfly found in the Neotropical realm.

== Species ==
Listed alphabetically:

- Godartiana byses (Godart, [1824])
- Godartiana muscosa (Butler, 1870)
