= Idioneurula =

Scientific classification
- Domain: Eukaryota
- Kingdom: Animalia
- Phylum: Arthropoda
- Class: Insecta
- Order: Lepidoptera
- Family: Nymphalidae
- Tribe: Satyrini
- Genus: Idioneurula; Strand, 1932

Type species
- Idioneura erebioides C. & R. Felder, [1867]

Synonyms
- Idioneura C. & R. Felder, [1867]

Genus of butterflies

Idioneurula is a genus of butterflies in the family Nymphalidae. The species of this genus are found in the Neotropics.

== Species ==
- Idioneurula donegani Huertas & Arias, 2007
- Idioneurula erebioides (C.Felder & R.Felder, 1867)
- Idioneurula eremita Viloria & Pyrcz, 2007
- Idioneurula jacquelinae Pyrcz, 1995
- Idioneurula socorroi Villalobos-Moreno & Salazar, 2013

== Taxonomy ==
The type species (through Article 67.8 (replacement names)) is Idioneura erebioides C. Felder and R Felder, 1867.
