= Parataygetis =

Scientific classification
- Kingdom: Animalia
- Phylum: Arthropoda
- Class: Insecta
- Order: Lepidoptera
- Family: Nymphalidae
- Subfamily: Satyrinae
- Tribe: Satyrini
- Subtribe: Euptychiina
- Genus: Parataygetis; Forster, 1964

Genus of butterflies

Parataygetis is a genus of satyrid butterflies found in the Neotropical realm.

== Species ==
Listed alphabetically:

- Parataygetis albinotata (Butler, 1867)
- Parataygetis lineata (Godman & Salvin, 1880)
