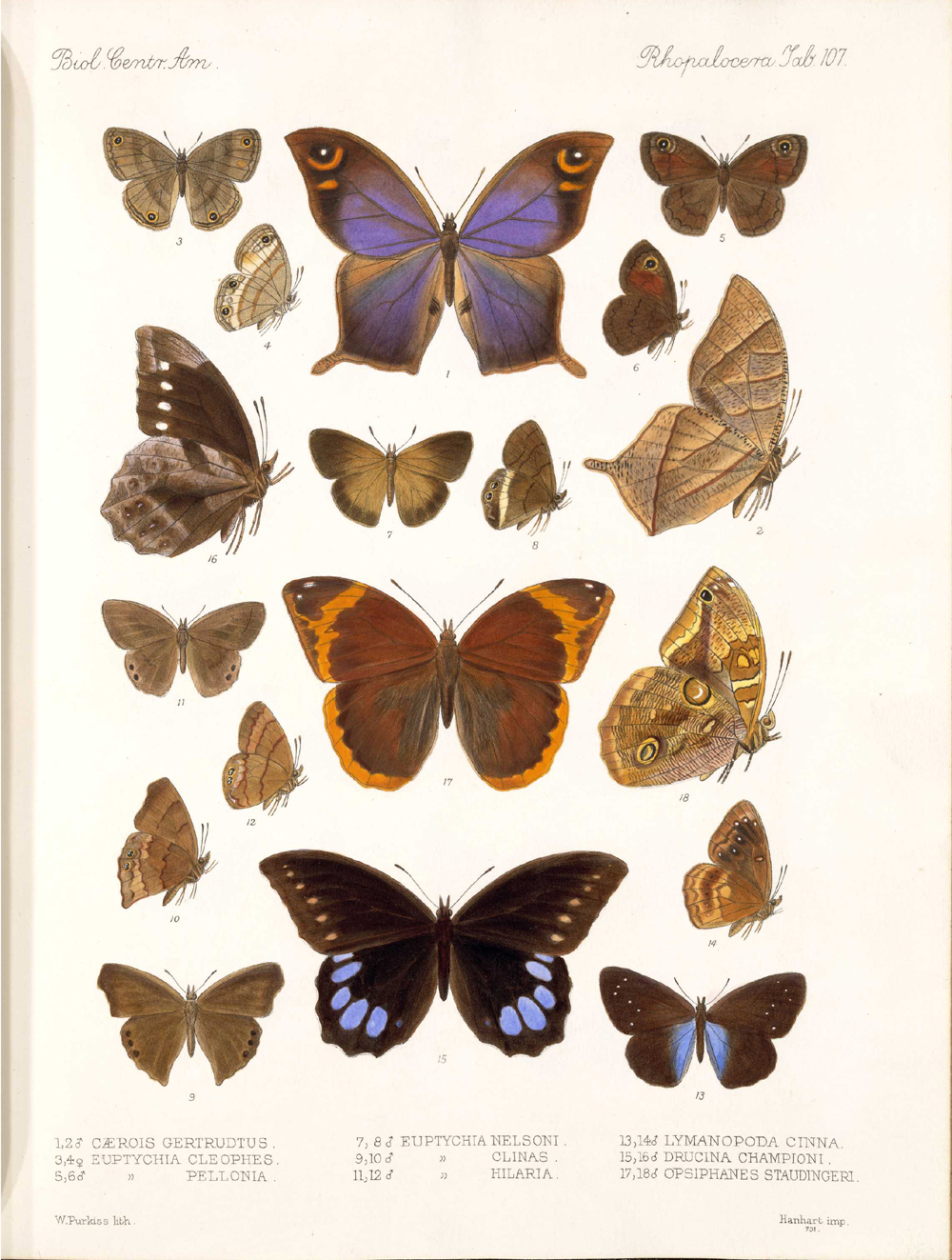
- Pindis pellonia, figures 5 and 6

Scientific classification
- Kingdom: Animalia
- Phylum: Arthropoda
- Class: Insecta
- Order: Lepidoptera
- Family: Nymphalidae
- Subfamily: Satyrinae
- Tribe: Satyrini
- Subtribe: Euptychiina
- Genus: Pindis; Felder, 1869

= Pindis =

Genus of butterflies

Pindis is a genus of satyrid butterflies found in the Neotropical realm.

== Species ==
Listed alphabetically:

- Pindis pellonia (Godman, [1901])
- Pindis squamistriga R. Felder, 1869
