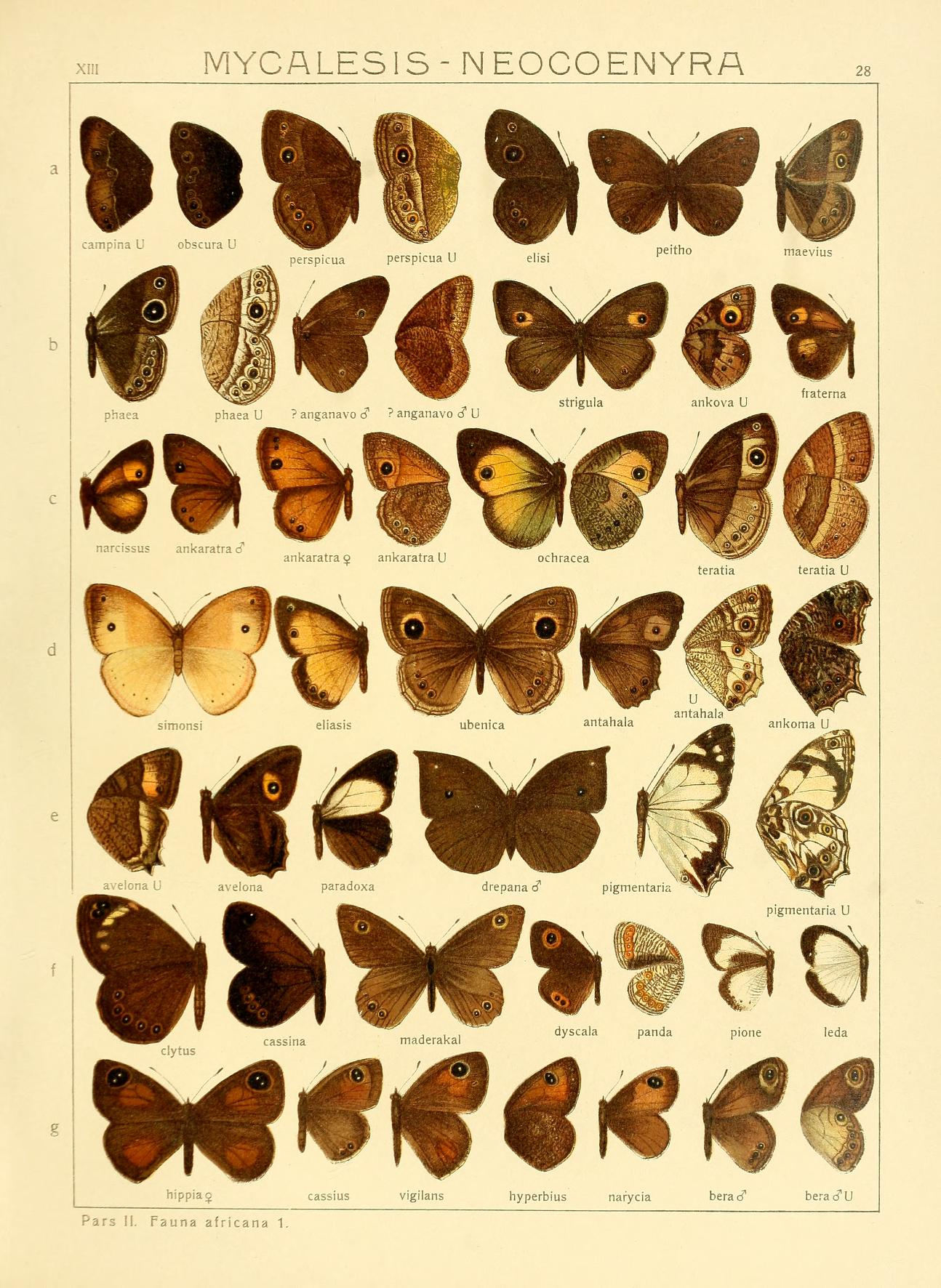
- Melampias huebneri in Adalbert Seitz's Fauna Africana

Scientific classification
- Domain: Eukaryota
- Kingdom: Animalia
- Phylum: Arthropoda
- Class: Insecta
- Order: Lepidoptera
- Family: Nymphalidae
- Tribe: Satyrini
- Genus: Melampias; Hübner, 1819
- Species: M. huebneri

Binomial name
- Melampias huebneri (van Son, 1955)

Synonyms
- Melampias hübneri van Son, 1955; Papilio hyperbius Linnaeus, 1764 (preocc. Papilio hyperbius Linnaeus, 1763)

= Melampias =

Genus of butterflies

Melampias is a monotypic butterfly genus in the family Nymphalidae. Its one species, Melampias huebneri, the Boland brown, is found in South Africa.

The wingspan is 35–38 mm for males and 33–35 mm for females. Adults are on wing from June (subspecies huebneri) or from August (subspecies steniptera) to October and sometimes November. There is one generation per year.

The larvae probably feed on Poaceae. Larvae have been reared on Ehrharta erecta and Avena sativa.

== Subspecies ==
- Melampias huebneri huebneri (Western Cape from Clanwilliam south to the Cape Peninsula, east to the Gouritz River, at higher altitudes along the western edge of the Little Karoo from Oudtshoorn to Calitzdorp)
- Melampias huebneri steniptera Vári, 1971 (hills in Namaqualand from Springbok to area just south of Garies in Northern Cape)
