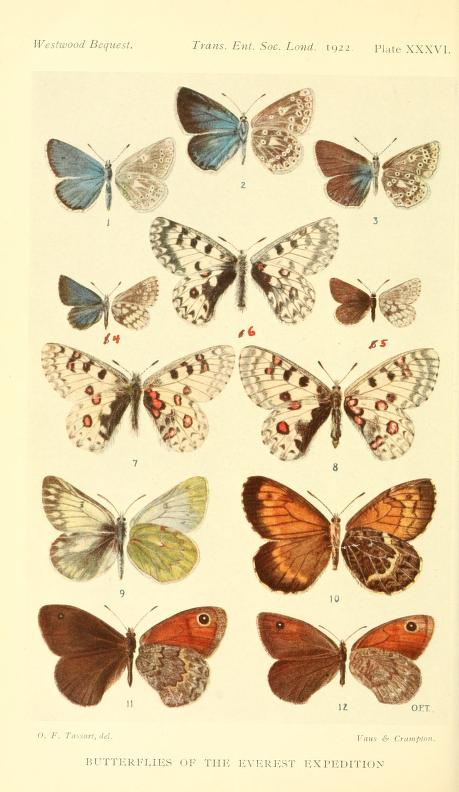
- Argestina karta, figures 11 and 12

Scientific classification
- Kingdom: Animalia
- Phylum: Arthropoda
- Class: Insecta
- Order: Lepidoptera
- Family: Nymphalidae
- Tribe: Satyrini
- Genus: Argestina; Riley, 1923

= Argestina =

Genus of butterflies

Argestina is a butterfly genus of the Satyrinae. The genus is confined to the Palearctic. All the species are from China and Tibet.

== Species ==
- Argestina phantasta Goltz, 1938 Yunnan
- Argestina pomena (Evans, 1915)
  - A. p. shuana (Evans, 1915) Tibet
  - A. p. chiuna (Bailey, 1935) Tibet
- Argestina inconstans (South, 1913) Tibet
- Argestina irma Evans, 1923 Tibet
- Argestina karta Riley, 1923 Tibet
- Argestina nitida Riley, 1923 Tibet
- Argestina waltoni (Elwes, 1906) Tibet
