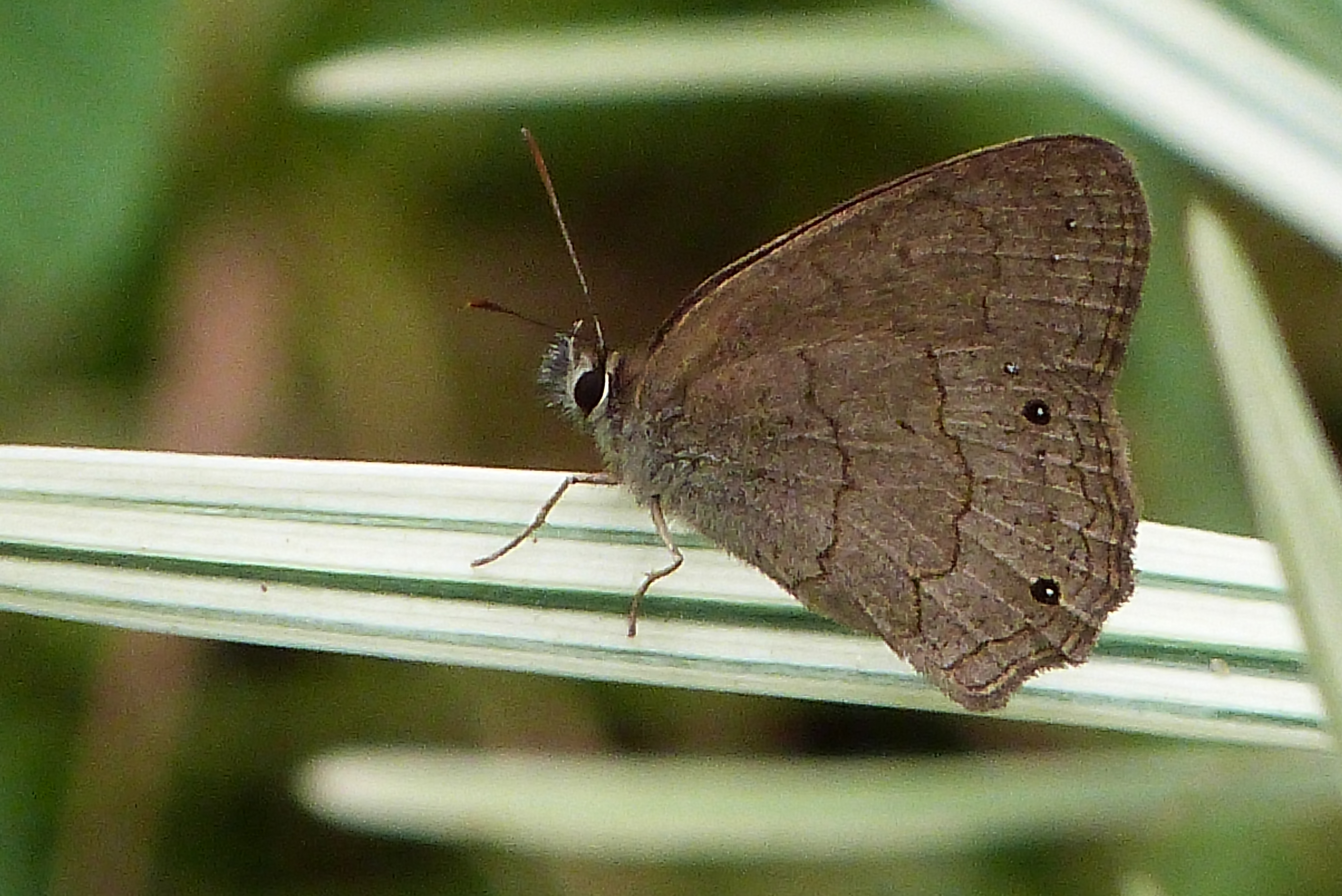
- Paryphthimoides phronius

Scientific classification
- Kingdom: Animalia
- Phylum: Arthropoda
- Class: Insecta
- Order: Lepidoptera
- Family: Nymphalidae
- Subfamily: Satyrinae
- Tribe: Satyrini
- Subtribe: Euptychiina
- Genus: Paryphthimoides; Forster, 1964

= Paryphthimoides =

Genus of butterflies

Paryphthimoides is a genus of satyrid butterflies found in the Neotropical realm.

== Species ==
Listed alphabetically:

- Paryphthimoides argulus (Godart, [1824])
- Paryphthimoides difficilis Forster, 1964
- Paryphthimoides eous (Butler, 1867)
- Paryphthimoides grimon (Godart, [1824])
- Paryphthimoides melobosis (Capronnier, 1874)
- Paryphthimoides numeria (C. & R. Felder, 1867)
- Paryphthimoides numilia (C. & R. Felder, 1867)
- Paryphthimoides phronius (Godart, [1824])
- Paryphthimoides poltys (Prittwitz, 1865)
- Paryphthimoides sylvina (C. & R. Felder, 1867)
- Paryphthimoides undulata (Butler, 1867)
- Paryphthimoides vestigiata (Butler, 1867)
- Paryphthimoides zeredatha (Butler, 1869)
