= Harjesia =

Scientific classification
- Kingdom: Animalia
- Phylum: Arthropoda
- Class: Insecta
- Order: Lepidoptera
- Family: Nymphalidae
- Subfamily: Satyrinae
- Tribe: Satyrini
- Subtribe: Euptychiina
- Genus: Harjesia; Forster, 1964

Genus of butterflies

Harjesia is a genus of satyrid butterfly found in the Neotropical realm.

== Species ==
Listed alphabetically:

- Harjesia blanda (Möschler, 1877)
- Harjesia griseola (Weymer, 1911)
- Harjesia obscura (Butler, 1867)
- Harjesia oreba (Butler, 1870)
- Harjesia vrazi (Kheil, 1896)
