= Erichthodes =

Scientific classification
- Kingdom: Animalia
- Phylum: Arthropoda
- Class: Insecta
- Order: Lepidoptera
- Family: Nymphalidae
- Subfamily: Satyrinae
- Tribe: Satyrini
- Subtribe: Euptychiina
- Genus: Erichthodes; Forster, 1964

Genus of butterflies

Erichthodes is a genus of satyrid butterflies found in the Neotropical realm.

== Species ==
Listed alphabetically:

- Erichthodes antonina (C. & R. Felder, [1867])
- Erichthodes arius (Weymer, 1911)
- Erichthodes jovita (C. & R. Felder, 1867)
- Erichthodes julia (Weymer, 1911)
- Erichthodes narapa (Schaus, 1902)
