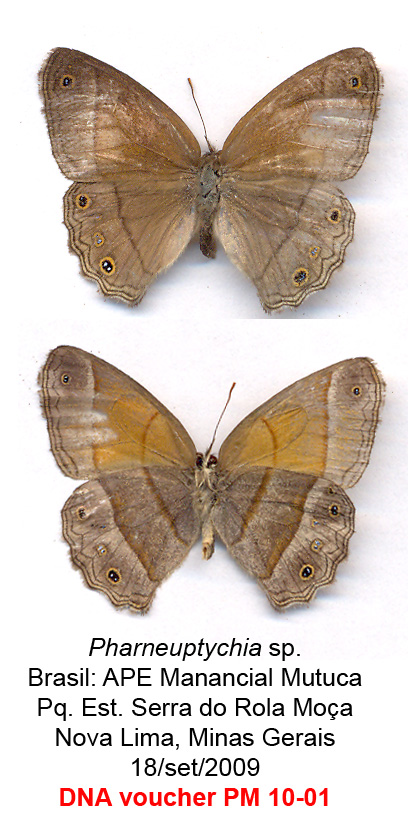
- Pharneuptychia sp.

Scientific classification
- Kingdom: Animalia
- Phylum: Arthropoda
- Class: Insecta
- Order: Lepidoptera
- Family: Nymphalidae
- Subfamily: Satyrinae
- Tribe: Satyrini
- Subtribe: Euptychiina
- Genus: Pharneuptychia; Forster, 1964

= Pharneuptychia =

Genus of butterflies

Pharneuptychia is a genus of satyrid butterflies found in the Neotropical realm.

== Species ==
Listed alphabetically:

- Pharneuptychia boliviana (Hayward, 1957)
- Pharneuptychia innocentia (C. & R. Felder, 1867)
- Pharneuptychia phares (Godart, [1824])
- Pharneuptychia pharnabazos (Bryk, 1953)
- Pharneuptychia pharnaces (Weymer, 1911)
- Pharneuptychia romanina (Bryk, 1953)
