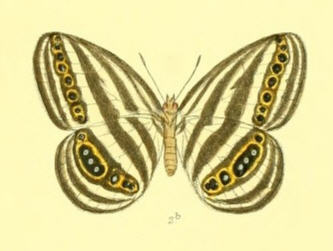
- Ragadia crito

Scientific classification
- Kingdom: Animalia
- Phylum: Arthropoda
- Clade: Pancrustacea
- Class: Insecta
- Order: Lepidoptera
- Family: Nymphalidae
- Subfamily: Satyrinae
- Tribe: Ragadiini; Herrich-Schäffer, 1864

= Ragadiini =

Tribe of butterflies

The Ragadiini are a small tribe of the Satyrinae in the Nymphalidae (brush-footed butterfly) family. This group contains three genera.

== Genera ==
- Acrophtalmia
- Acropolis
- Ragadia
