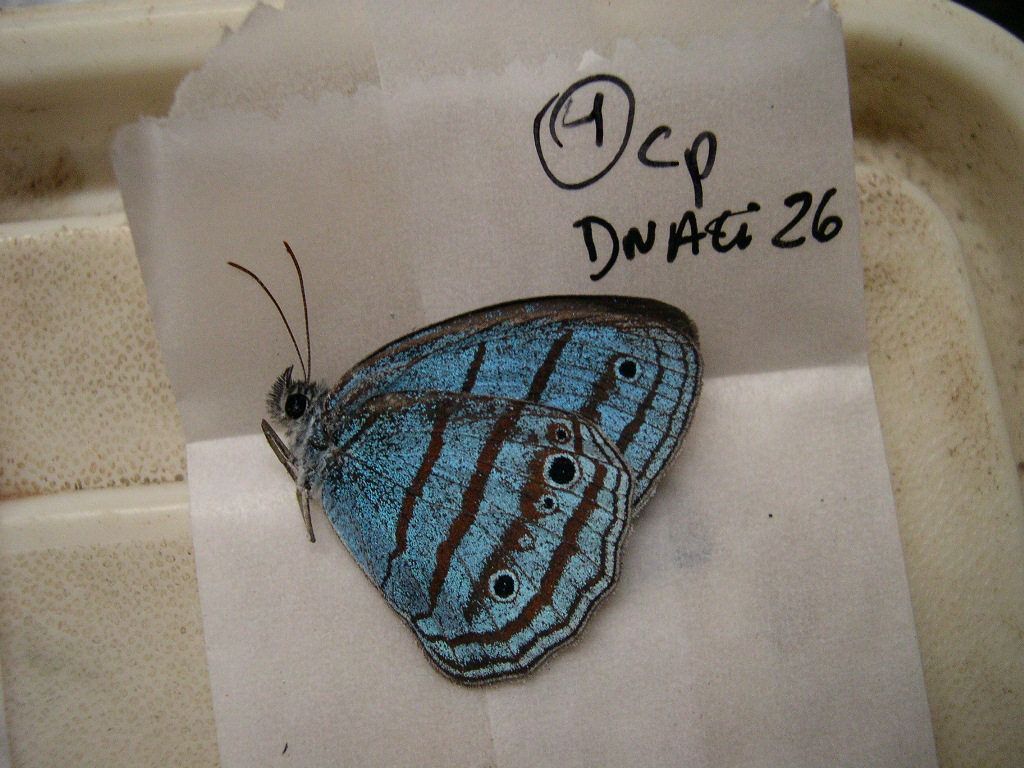
- Caeruleuptychia coelica

Scientific classification
- Kingdom: Animalia
- Phylum: Arthropoda
- Clade: Pancrustacea
- Class: Insecta
- Order: Lepidoptera
- Family: Nymphalidae
- Subfamily: Satyrinae
- Tribe: Satyrini
- Subtribe: Euptychiina
- Genus: Caeruleuptychia; Forster, 1964

Synonyms
- Weymerana Forster, 1964

= Caeruleuptychia =

Genus of butterflies

Caeruleuptychia is a genus of satyrid butterfly found in the Neotropical realm.

== Species ==
The following species, listed alphabetically, are assigned to this genus:

- Caeruleuptychia aegrota (Butler, 1867)
- Caeruleuptychia brixius (Godart, [1824])
- Caeruleuptychia caerulea (Butler, 1869)
- Caeruleuptychia coelestis (Butler, 1867)
- Caeruleuptychia coelica (Hewitson, 1869)
- Caeruleuptychia cyanites (Butler, 1871)
- Caeruleuptychia divina (Weymer, 1911)
- Caeruleuptychia glauca (Weymer, 1911)
- Caeruleuptychia helena (Anken, 1994)
- Caeruleuptychia helios (Weymer, 1911)
- Caeruleuptychia lobelia (Butler, 1870)
- Caeruleuptychia mare (Butler, 1869)
- Caeruleuptychia penicillata (Godman, 1905)
- Caeruleuptychia pilata (Butler, 1867)
- Caeruleuptychia scopulata (Godman, 1905)
- Caeruleuptychia tenera (Weymer, 1911)
- Caeruleuptychia twalela Brévignon, 2005
- Caeruleuptychia umbrosa (Butler, 1870)
- Caeruleuptychia urania (Butler, 1867)
- Caeruleuptychia ziza (Butler, 1869)
