= Ianussiusa =

Scientific classification
- Kingdom: Animalia
- Phylum: Arthropoda
- Class: Insecta
- Order: Lepidoptera
- Family: Nymphalidae
- Tribe: Satyrini
- Genus: Ianussiusa; Pyrcz & Viloria 2004
- Species: I. maso

Binomial name
- Ianussiusa maso (Godman, 1905)

Synonyms
- Lymanopoda maso Godman, 1905; Cheimas polyommatus Röber, 1927

Genus of butterflies

Ianussiusa is a monotypic butterfly genus in the family Nymphalidae. It contains only one species, Ianussiusa maso, which is found in Colombia and Venezuela.
