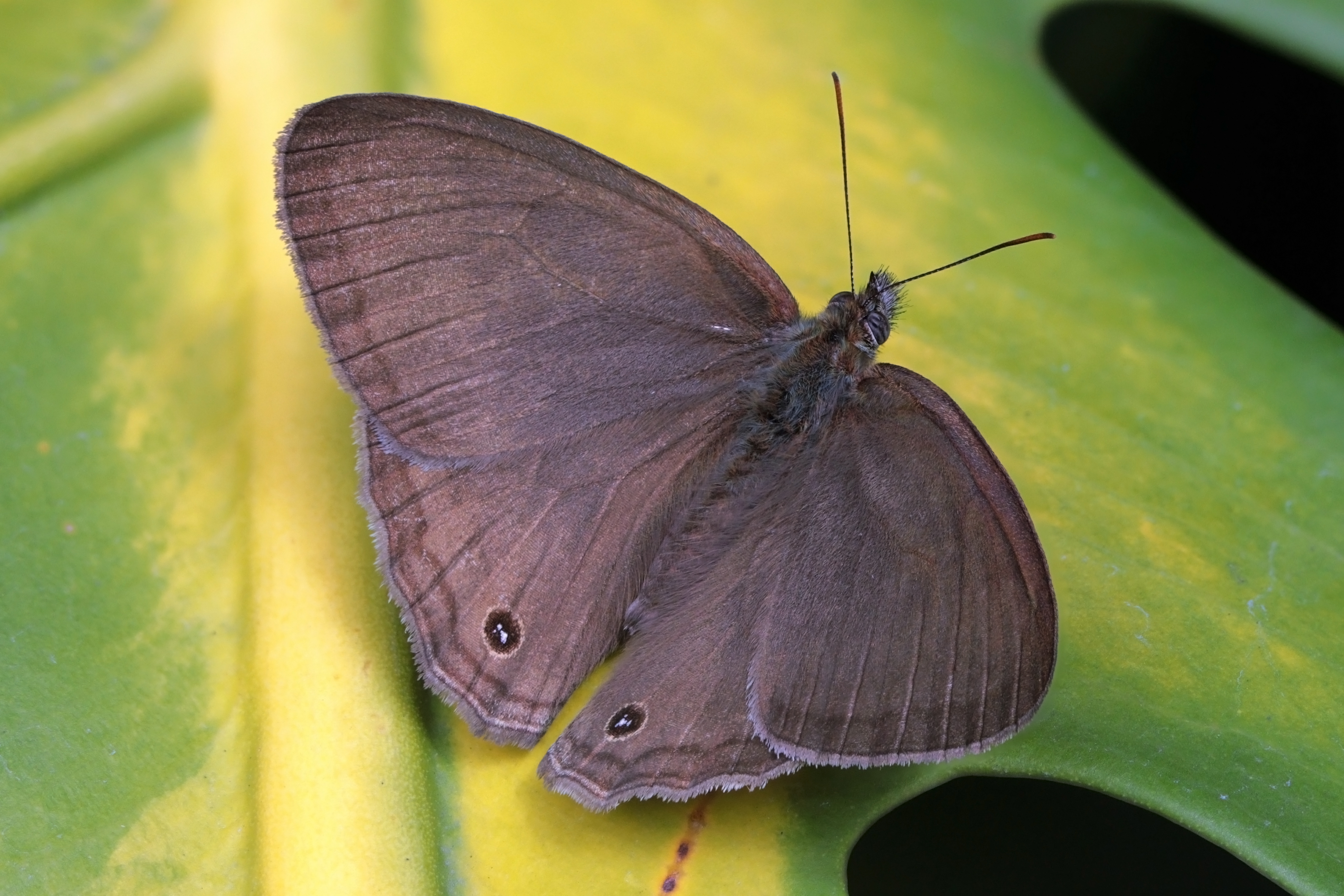
- Y. renata Renata satyr, Panama

Scientific classification
- Kingdom: Animalia
- Phylum: Arthropoda
- Class: Insecta
- Order: Lepidoptera
- Family: Nymphalidae
- Subfamily: Satyrinae
- Tribe: Satyrini
- Subtribe: Euptychiina
- Genus: Yphthimoides; Forster, 1964

= Yphthimoides =

Genus of butterflies

Yphthimoides is a genus of satyrid butterflies found in the Neotropical realm.

== Species ==
Listed alphabetically:

- Yphthimoides acmenis (Hübner, 1823)
- Yphthimoides affinis (Butler, 1867)
- Yphthimoides angularis (Butler, 1867)
- Yphthimoides argyrospila (Butler, 1867)
- Yphthimoides austera (Butler, 1867)
- Yphthimoides borasta (Schaus, 1902)
- Yphthimoides celmis (Godart, [1824])
- Yphthimoides cipoensis Freitas, 2004
- Yphthimoides eriphule (Butler, 1867)
- Yphthimoides leguialimai (Dyar, 1913)
- Yphthimoides maepius (Godart, [1824])
- Yphthimoides manasses (C. & R. Felder)
- Yphthimoides mimula (Hayward, 1954)
- Yphthimoides mythra (Weymer, 1911)
- Yphthimoides neomaenas (Hayward, 1967)
- Yphthimoides ochracea (Butler, 1867)
- Yphthimoides pacta (Weymer, 1911)
- Yphthimoides patricia (Hayward, 1957)
- Yphthimoides punctata (Weymer, 1911)
- Yphthimoides renata (Stoll, [1780])
- Yphthimoides straminea (Butler, 1867)
- Yphthimoides viviana (Romieux, 1927)
- Yphthimoides yphthima (C. & R. Felder, [1867])
