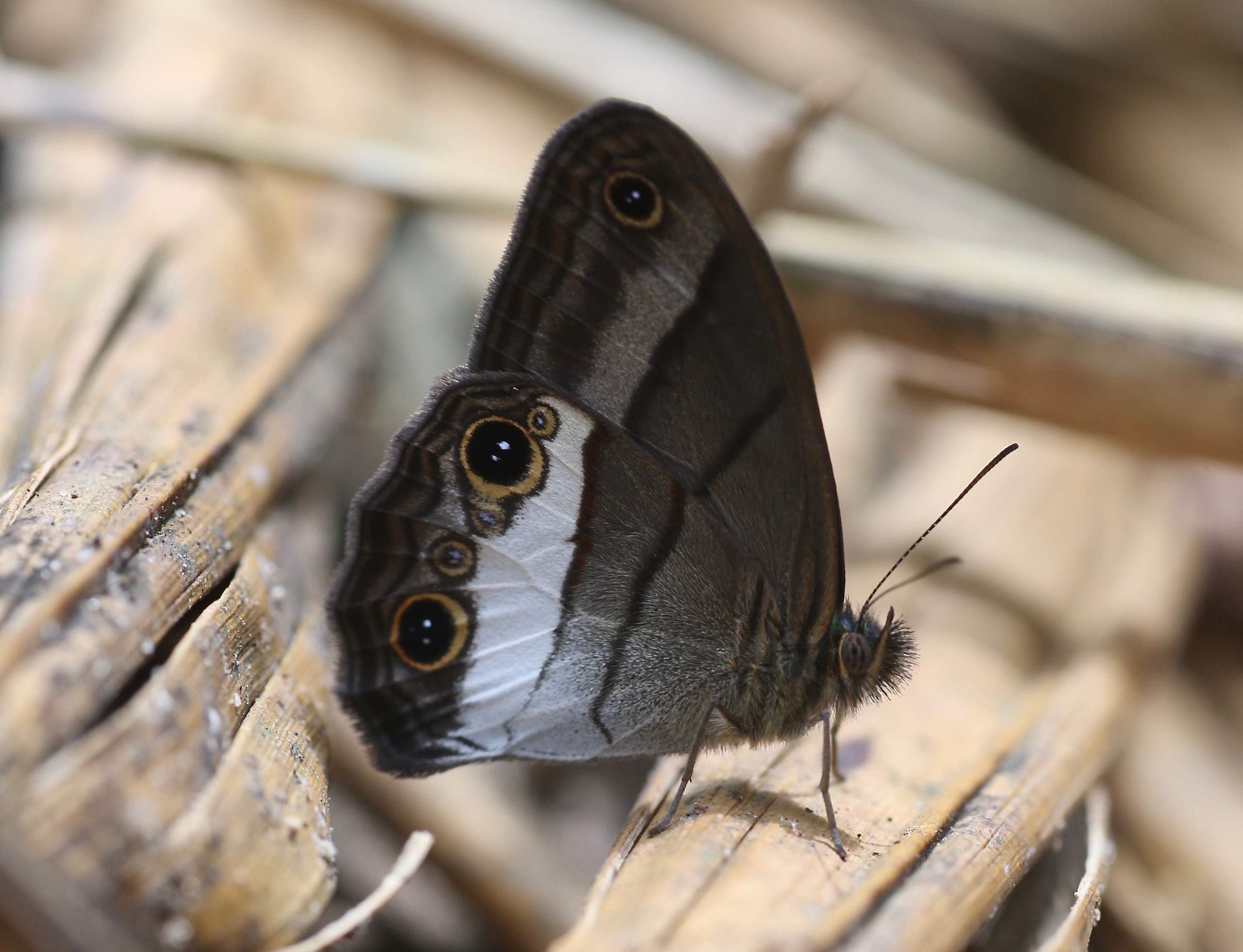
- Euptychoides nossis, Ecuador, Mindo

Scientific classification
- Kingdom: Animalia
- Phylum: Arthropoda
- Clade: Pancrustacea
- Class: Insecta
- Order: Lepidoptera
- Family: Nymphalidae
- Subfamily: Satyrinae
- Tribe: Satyrini
- Subtribe: Euptychiina
- Genus: Euptychoides; Forster, 1964

= Euptychoides =

Genus of butterflies

Euptychoides is a genus of satyrid butterflies found in the Neotropical realm.

== Species ==
Listed alphabetically:

- Euptychoides albofasciata (Hewitson, 1869)
- Euptychoides castrensis (Schaus, 1902)
- Euptychoides eugenia (C. & R. Felder, 1867)
- Euptychoides fida (Weymer, 1911)
- Euptychoides griphe (C. & R. Felder, 1867)
- Euptychoides hotchkissi (Dyar, 1913)
- Euptychoides laccine (C. & R. Felder, 1867)
- Euptychoides nossis (Hewitson, 1862)
- Euptychoides pseudosaturnus Forster, 1964
- Euptychoides saturnus (Butler, 1867)
