= Proboscis (butterfly) =

Scientific classification
- Domain: Eukaryota
- Kingdom: Animalia
- Phylum: Arthropoda
- Class: Insecta
- Order: Lepidoptera
- Family: Nymphalidae
- Tribe: Satyrini
- Genus: Proboscis; Thieme, 1907

Genus of butterflies

Proboscis is a genus of butterflies from the subfamily Satyrinae in the family Nymphalidae. The species in the genus Proboscis occur in South America.

== Species ==
- Proboscis propylea (Hewitson, 1857)
- Proboscis pomarancia Pyrcz, 2004
