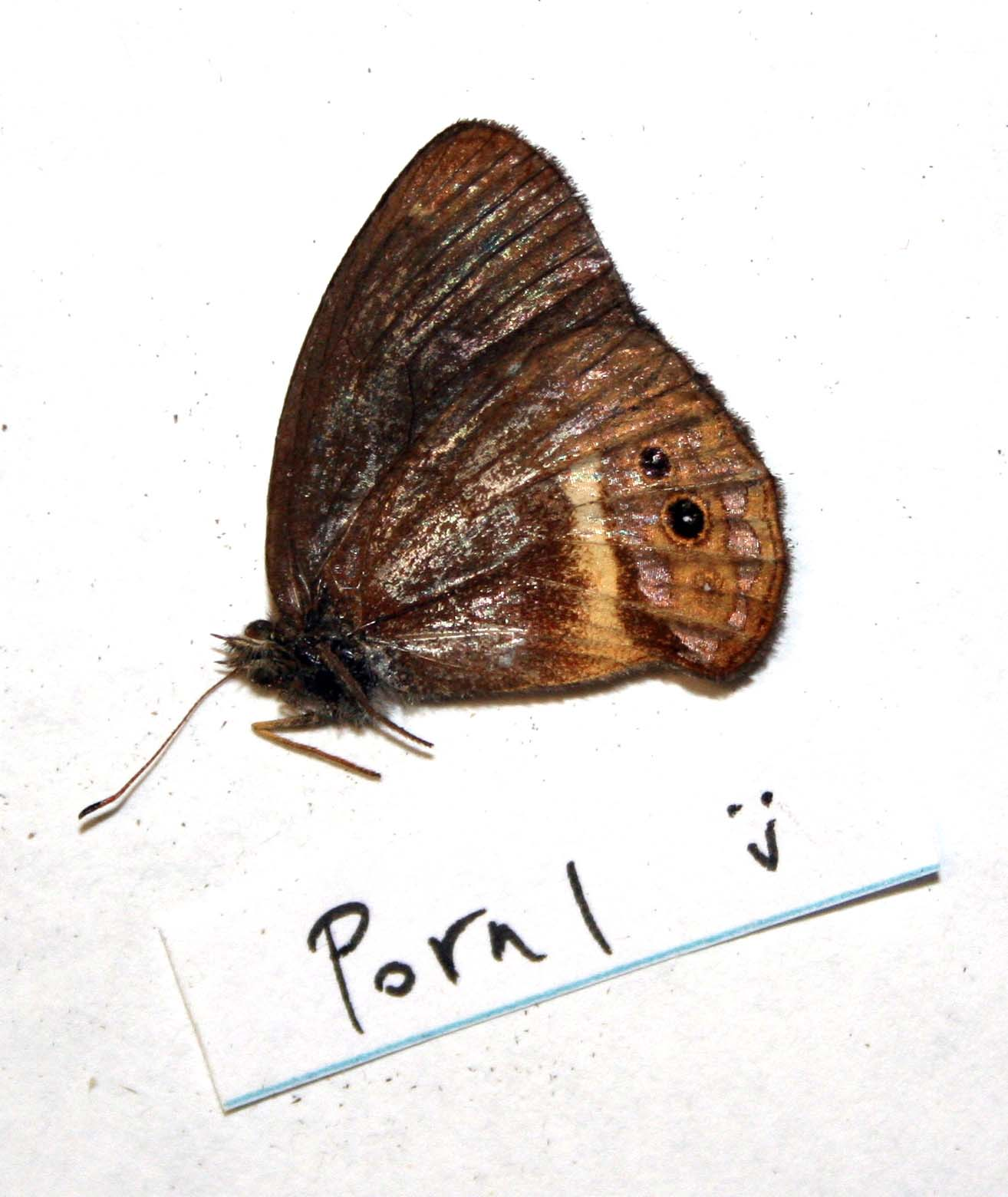
- Platypthima ornata

Scientific classification
- Kingdom: Animalia
- Phylum: Arthropoda
- Class: Insecta
- Order: Lepidoptera
- Family: Nymphalidae
- Subtribe: Hypocystina
- Genus: Platypthima; Rothschild & Jordan, 1905

Synonyms
- Altiapa Parsons, 1986

= Platypthima =

Genus of butterflies

Platypthima is a genus of satyrid butterflies.The genus is endemic to New Guinea.

== Species ==
Listed alphabetically:

- Platypthima decolor Rothschild & Jordan, 1905
- Platypthima dispar Joicey & Talbot, 1922
- Platypthima homochroa (Rothschild & Jordan, 1907)
- Platypthima klossi Rothschild & Durrant, 1915
- Platypthima leucomelas (Rothschild, 1903)
- Platypthima ornata Rothschild & Jordan, 1905
- Platypthima pandora (Joicey & Talbot, 1916)
- Platypthima placiva Jordan, 1924
- Platypthima simplex Rothschild & Jordan, 1905
