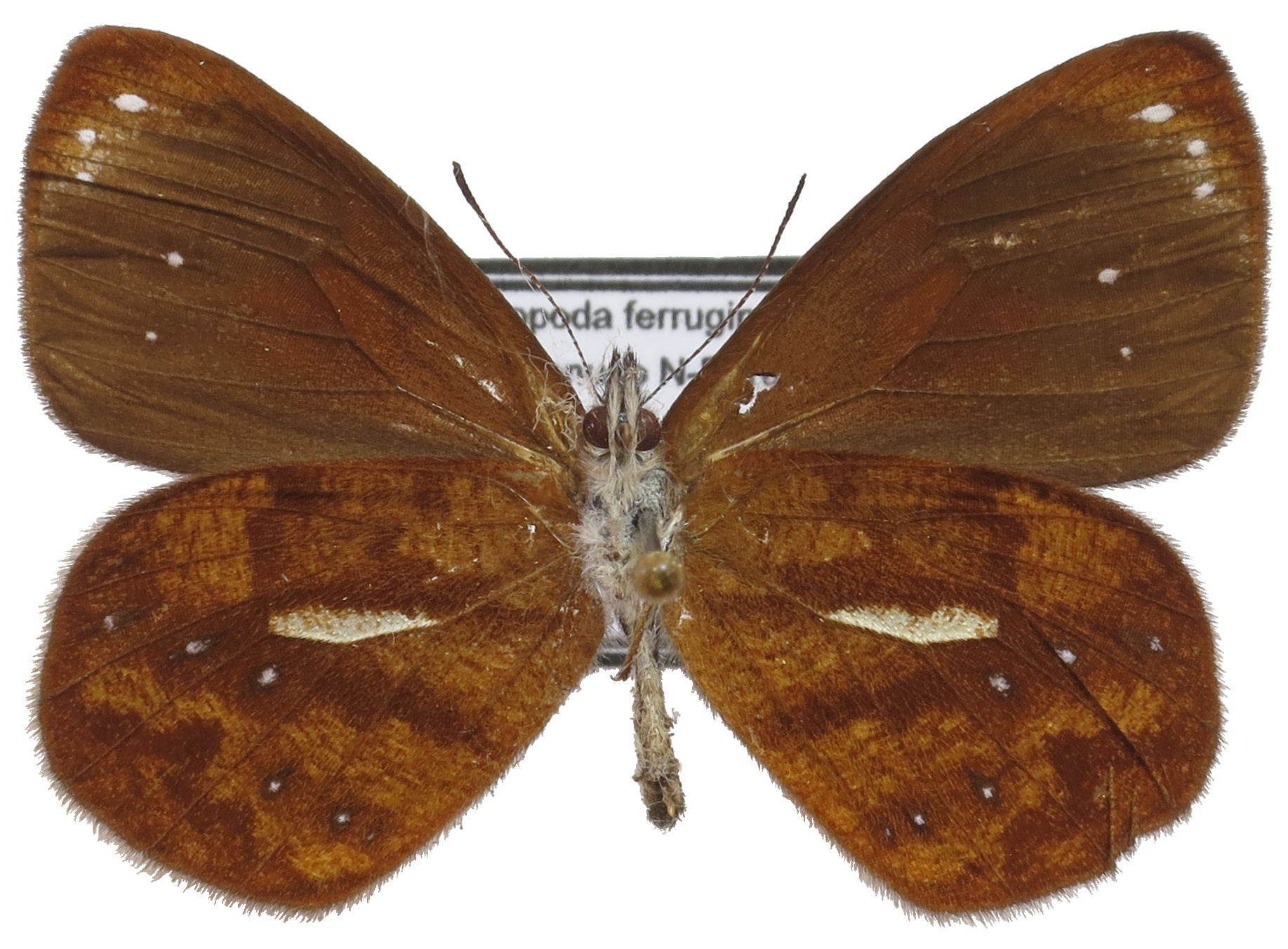
- Lymanopoda ferruginosa male - Huanuco

Scientific classification
- Domain: Eukaryota
- Kingdom: Animalia
- Phylum: Arthropoda
- Class: Insecta
- Order: Lepidoptera
- Family: Nymphalidae
- Subtribe: Pronophilina
- Genus: Lymanopoda; Westwood, [1851]

Species
- Many, see text

Synonyms
- Sarromia Westwood, [1851]; Zabirnia Hewitson, 1877; Trophonina Röber, [1889]

= Lymanopoda =

Genus of insects

Lymanopoda is a butterfly genus from the subfamily Satyrinae in the family Nymphalidae found in north-western South America.

== Species ==
Listed alphabetically:

- Lymanopoda acraeida Butler, 1868 – acraeid mimic satyr
- Lymanopoda albocincta Hewitson, 1861 – white-banded mountain satyr
- Lymanopoda albomaculata Hewitson, 1861 – pearled mountain satyr
- Lymanopoda altaselva Adams & Bernard, 1979
- Lymanopoda altis Weymer, 1890
- Lymanopoda apulia Hopffer, 1874 – Apulia mountain satyr
- Lymanopoda araneola Pyrcz, 2004
- Lymanopoda caeruleata Godman & Salvin, 1880
- Lymanopoda caracara Pyrcz, Willmott & Hall, 1999
- Lymanopoda caucana Weymer, 1911
- Lymanopoda caudalis Rosenberg & Talbot, 1914
- Lymanopoda cinna Godman & Salvin, 1889 – blue-stained satyr
- Lymanopoda confusa Brown, 1943
- Lymanopoda dietzi Adams & Bernardi, 1981
- Lymanopoda dyari Pyrcz, 2004
- Lymanopoda eubagioides Butler, 1873 – pale mountain satyr
- Lymanopoda euopis Godman & Salvin, 1878
- Lymanopoda excisa Weymer, 1912
- Lymanopoda ferruginosa Butler, 1868 – rusty mountain satyr
- Lymanopoda galactea Staudinger, 1897
- Lymanopoda hazelana Brown, 1943
- Lymanopoda huilana Weymer, 1890
- Lymanopoda hyagnis Weymer, 1911
- Lymanopoda ichu Pyrcz, Willmott & Hall, 1999
- Lymanopoda inde Pyrcz, 2004
- Lymanopoda ingasayana Pyrcz, 2004
- Lymanopoda ionius Westwood, [1851]
- Lymanopoda labda Hewitson, 1861
- Lymanopoda labineta Hewitson, 1870
- Lymanopoda lactea Hewitson, 1861
- Lymanopoda lebbaea C. & R. Felder, 1867
- Lymanopoda magna Pyrcz, 2004
- Lymanopoda maletera Adams & Bernard, 1979
- Lymanopoda marianna Staudinger, 1897
- Lymanopoda melendeza Adams, 1986
- Lymanopoda melia Weymer, 1912
- Lymanopoda nadia Pyrcz, 1999
- Lymanopoda nevada Krüger, 1924
- Lymanopoda nivea Staudinger, 1888
- Lymanopoda obsoleta (Westwood, [1851]) – obsoleta satyr
- Lymanopoda orientalis Viloria & Camacho, 1999
- Lymanopoda panacea (Hewitson, 1869)
- Lymanopoda paramera Adams & Bernard, 1979
- Lymanopoda pieridina Röber, 1927
- Lymanopoda prusia (Heimlich, 1973)
- Lymanopoda rana Weymer, 1912
- Lymanopoda samius Westwood, [1851]
- Lymanopoda schmidti Adams, 1986
- Lymanopoda shefteli Dyar, 1913
- Lymanopoda tolima Weymer, 1911
- Lymanopoda translucida Weymer, 1912 – golden mountain satyr
- Lymanopoda venosa Butler, 1868
- Lymanopoda viventieni (Apolinar, 1924)
