= Arhuaco (butterfly) =

Scientific classification
- Domain: Eukaryota
- Kingdom: Animalia
- Phylum: Arthropoda
- Class: Insecta
- Order: Lepidoptera
- Family: Nymphalidae
- Subfamily: Satyrinae
- Tribe: Satyrini
- Genus: Arhuaco; Adams & Bernard, 1977

Genus of brush-footed butterflies

Arhuaco is a Neotropical genus of butterflies in the nymphalid subfamily Satyrinae. The genus was erected by Michael Jan Adams and George Igor Bernard in 1977.

== Species ==
- Arhuaco dryadina (Schaus, 1913)
- Arhuaco ica Adams & Bernard, 1977
