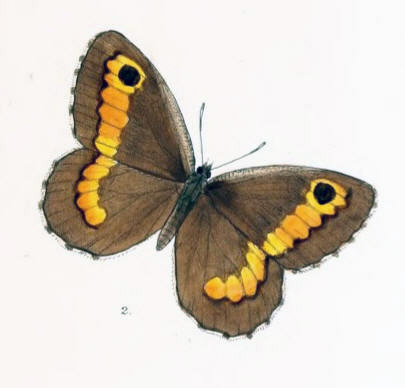

Scientific classification
- Domain: Eukaryota
- Kingdom: Animalia
- Phylum: Arthropoda
- Class: Insecta
- Order: Lepidoptera
- Family: Nymphalidae
- Genus: Kanetisa; Moore, 1893
- Species: K. digna

Binomial name
- Kanetisa digna (Marshall, 1883)

Synonyms
- Hipparchia digna Marshall, 1883; Kanetisa digna perdigna Clench & Shoumatoff, 1956

= Kanetisa =

Genus of butterflies

Kanetisa is a monotypic butterfly genus from the subfamily Satyrinae in the family Nymphalidae. Its single species, Kanetisa digna, lives in India. Members have large bands across their wings.
