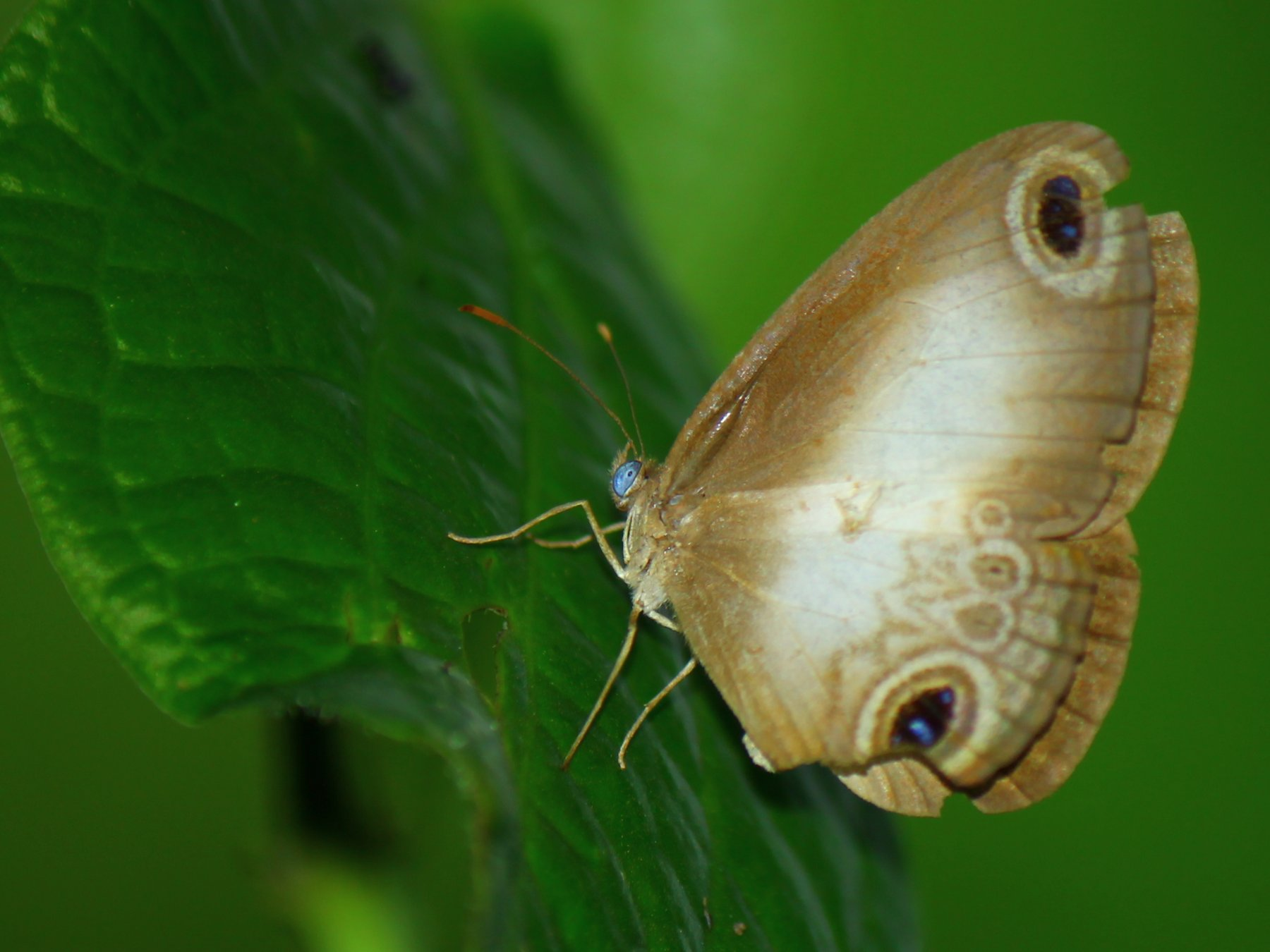
- Acrophtalmia leuce

Scientific classification
- Domain: Eukaryota
- Kingdom: Animalia
- Phylum: Arthropoda
- Class: Insecta
- Order: Lepidoptera
- Family: Nymphalidae
- Tribe: Ragadiini
- Genus: Acrophtalmia; C. Felder and R. Felder 1861

= Acrophtalmia =

Genus of butterflies

Acrophtalmia is a genus of butterflies in the family Nymphalidae.

== Species ==
- Acrophtalmia artemis C. & R. Felder, 1861
- Acrophtalmia leuce C. & R. Felder, [1867]
- Acrophtalmia windorum Miller & Miller, 1978
