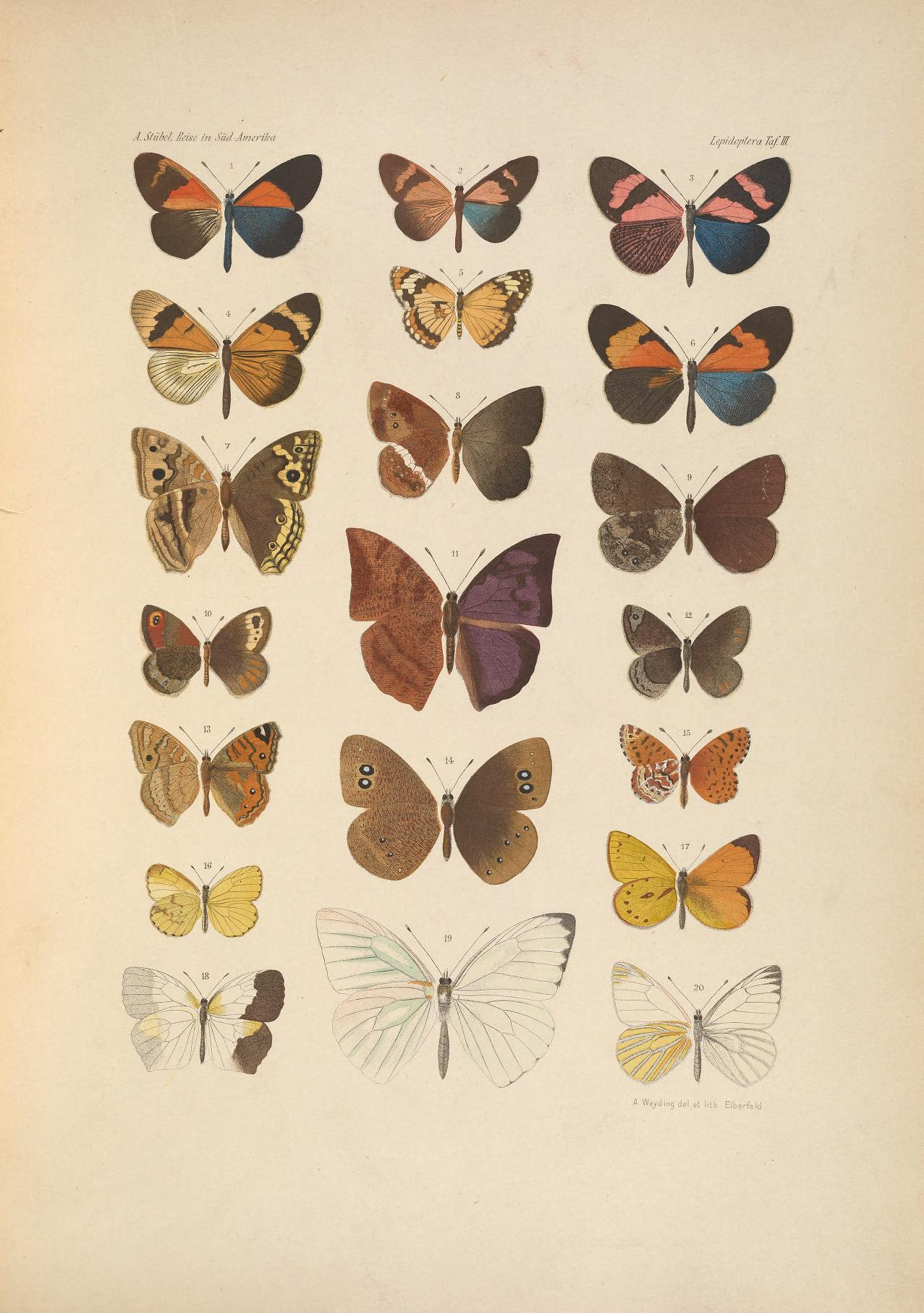
- Punapedaliodes albopunctata figure 9

Scientific classification
- Kingdom: Animalia
- Phylum: Arthropoda
- Class: Insecta
- Order: Lepidoptera
- Family: Nymphalidae
- Subtribe: Pronophilina
- Genus: Punapedaliodes; Forster, 1964

= Punapedaliodes =

Genus of brush-footed butterflies

Punapedaliodes is a Neotropical genus of butterflies in the family Nymphalidae.

== Species ==
- Punapedaliodes albopunctata (Weymer, 1890)
- Punapedaliodes flavopunctata (Staudinger, 1894)
