= Argyronympha =

Scientific classification
- Kingdom: Animalia
- Phylum: Arthropoda
- Class: Insecta
- Order: Lepidoptera
- Family: Nymphalidae
- Subtribe: Hypocystina
- Genus: Argyronympha; Mathew, 1886

Genus of butterflies

Argyronympha is a genus of satyrid butterflies.

== Species ==
Listed alphabetically:

- Argyronympha gracilipes Jordan, 1924
- Argyronympha pulchra Mathew, 1886
- Argyronympha rubianensis Grose-Smith, 1889
- Argyronympha ugiensis Mathew, 1886
- Argyronympha ulava Grose-Smith, 1889
