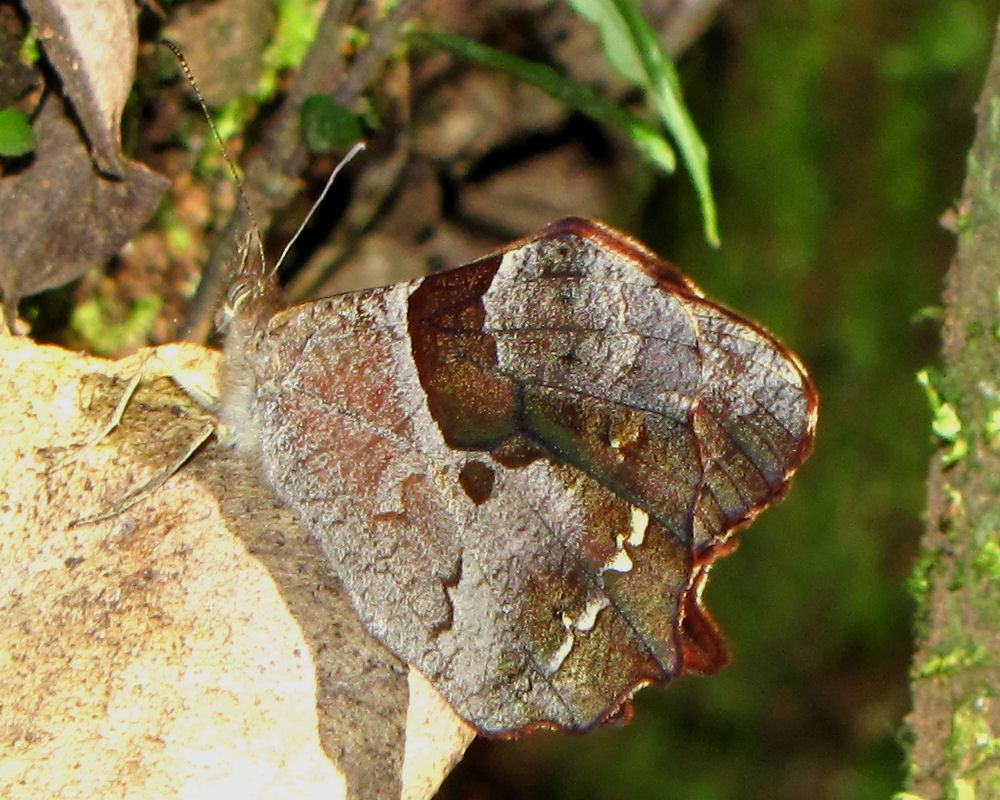
- Fiery satyr (Lasiophila orbifera), Arví Park, Colombia

Scientific classification
- Domain: Eukaryota
- Kingdom: Animalia
- Phylum: Arthropoda
- Class: Insecta
- Order: Lepidoptera
- Family: Nymphalidae
- Subtribe: Pronophilina
- Genus: Lasiophila; C. & R. Felder, 1859

Species
- See text

= Lasiophila =

Genus of butterflies

Lasiophila is a butterfly genus from the subfamily Satyrinae in the family Nymphalidae found in South America.

== Species ==
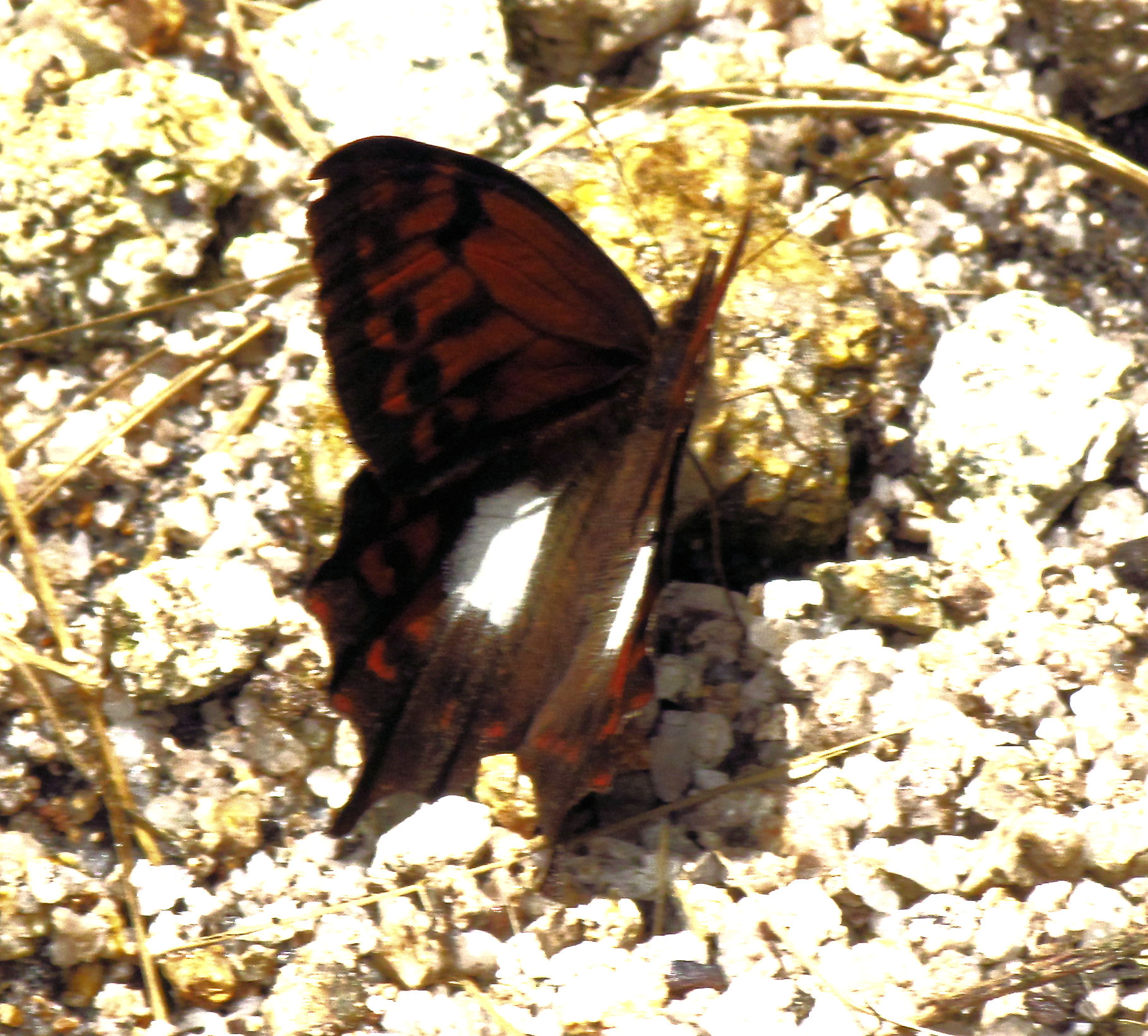
White-patched lasio (Lasiophila piscina), Machu Picchu, Peru

Listed alphabetically:

- Lasiophila alkaios Tessmann, 1928
- Lasiophila circe C. & R. Felder, 1859
- Lasiophila ciris Thieme, 1907
- Lasiophila cirta C. & R. Felder, 1859
- Lasiophila hewitsonia Butler, 1868
- Lasiophila orbifera Butler, 1868 – fiery satyr, obifera satyr
- Lasiophila palades (Hewitson, 1872)
- Lasiophila parthyene (Hewitson, 1872) – Partheyne satyr
- Lasiophila phalaesia (Hewitson, 1868)
- Lasiophila piscina Thieme, 1903 – piscina satyr, white-patched lasio
- Lasiophila prosymna (Hewitson, 1857)
- Lasiophila regia Staudinger, 1897
- Lasiophila zapatoza (Westwood, [1851])
