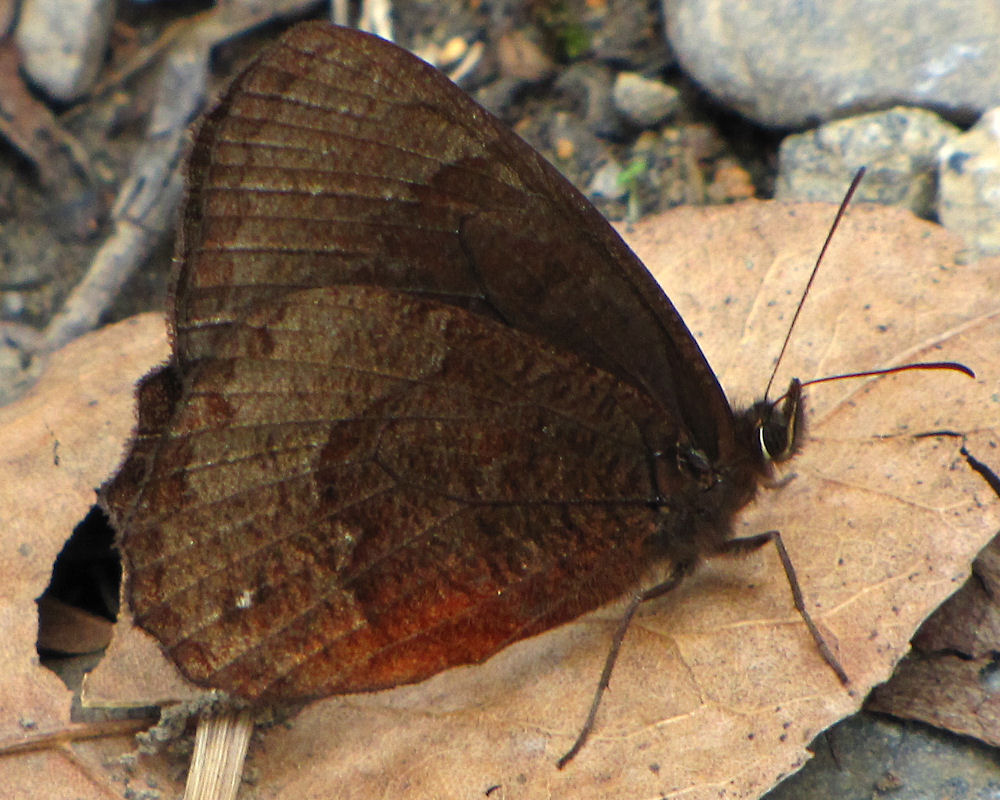
- Montagna mountain satyr (Pedaliodes montagna), Arví Park, Colombia

Scientific classification
- Kingdom: Animalia
- Phylum: Arthropoda
- Class: Insecta
- Order: Lepidoptera
- Family: Nymphalidae
- Tribe: Satyrini
- Subtribe: Pronophilina; Reuter, 1896

= Pronophilina =

Subtribe of butterflies

Pronophilina is a Neotropical subtribe of butterflies of the subfamily Satyrinae. They are a species-rich group with highest diversity in the tropical and subtropical mountains, especially the Andes. Before 1970, they were poorly studied, but recent interest has resulted in high rates of species description from previously unexplored mountain ranges. However, there is still a lack of knowledge on their biology and ecology. Their relationship to other groups of Satyrine butterflies and their complex patterns of speciation within and among mountain ranges have led to several biogeographic discussions.

== Systematics and taxonomy ==
Traditionally the name Pronophilini (or Pronophilidi) was used to describe a tribe of Neotropical satyrines, but modern arrangement place them as a subtribe within the tribe Satyrini of the Satyrinae. The number of genera included in Pronophilina is disputed, since some genera were formally transferred to the subtribes Erebiina and Hypocystinas, but some authors reject this arrangement.

Morphological analysis indicates there is a distinct core group of Pronophilina sensu stricto, and one or two additional groups (Neotropical Erebiina and Hypocystina in their original designation), but molecular analysis suggest they are each other's sister taxa and form a monophyletic group.

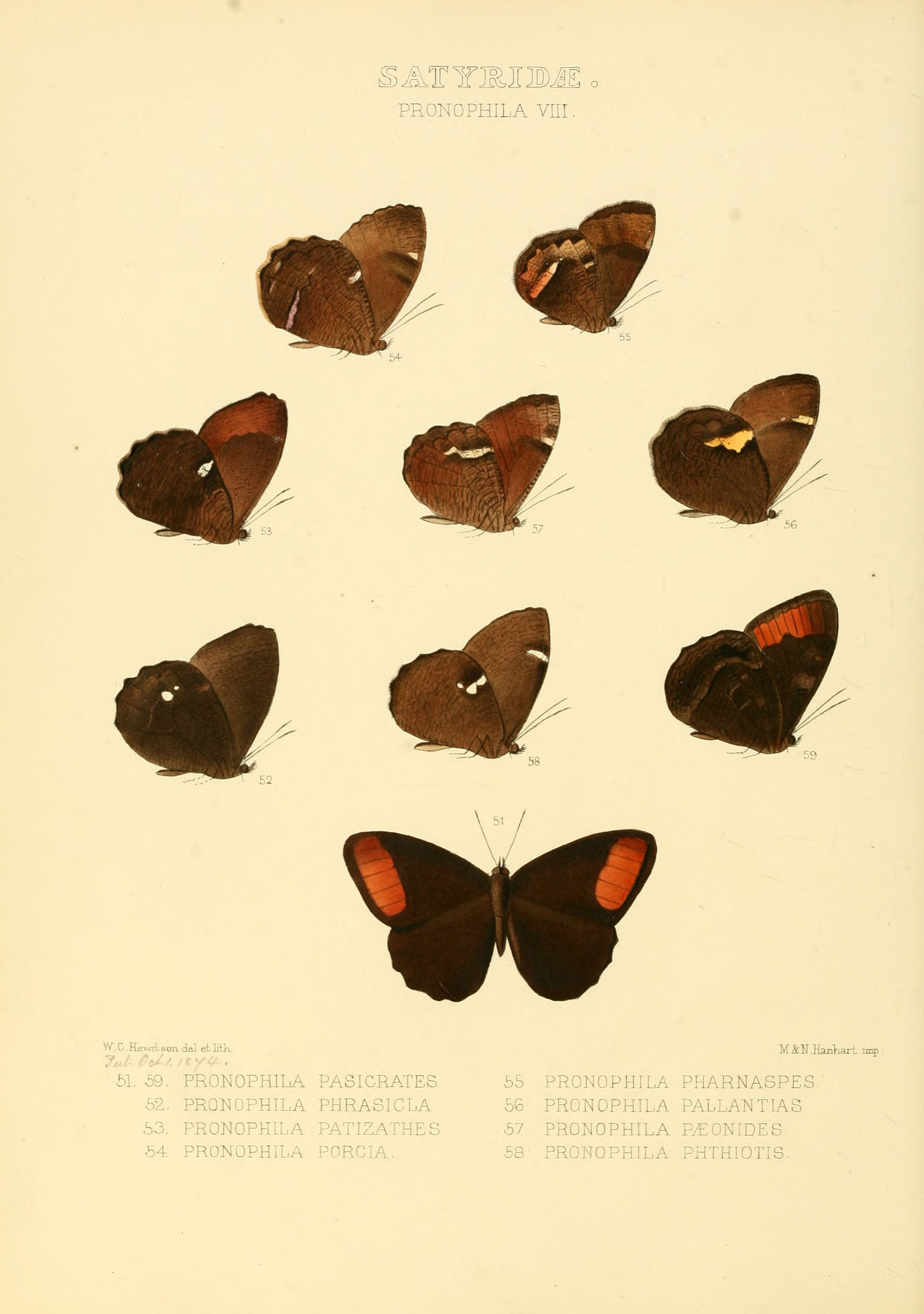
Illustrations of New Species of Exotic Butterflies Pronophila VIII

By the time Reuter proposed Pronophilidi as a formal tribe, there were some 230 described species. That number rose to 300 species by 1907, and 370 by 1970, primarily due to the work on museum and collection specimens by (in chronological order) William Chapman Hewitson, Cajetan Freiherr von Felder & Rudolf Felder, Arthur Gardiner Butler, Otto Staudinger, Theodor Otto Thieme and Gustav Weymer. More detailed field studies in the northern Andes by Adams and Bernard during the 1970s and 1980s resulted in many new taxa descriptions and a better understanding of their distribution and ecology and lead to an increased interest in this group after the 1990s. More than 100 species have been described since 1970, mostly due to contribution from A. L. Viloria, T. W. Pyrcz and G. Lamas, and it is estimated that the number of known taxa (including several yet unpublished species and subspecies descriptions) has nearly doubled in that period.

== Description ==
The subtribe Pronophilina can be separated from other American satyrines by the following three external morphological synapomorphies: eyes always densely hairy; hindwing cross vein m1-m2 always curved or angled basally into the discal cell; maximum length of hindwing discal cell equal to or longer than half the total maximum length of the hindwing (excluding tails). These characters separate the Pronophilina sensu stricto from other Neotropical montane satyrids previously included in the group. This arrangement has been adopted by Lamas, but phylogenetic analysis based on molecular data suggests a larger, more inclusive delimitation of Pronophilina is needed.

The background color of most species is dominated by brown, dark gray or black, with few and slight distinctive features in the wings, but some species show colorful variations between white, yellow, orange, red and iridescent blue.

=== Genera ===
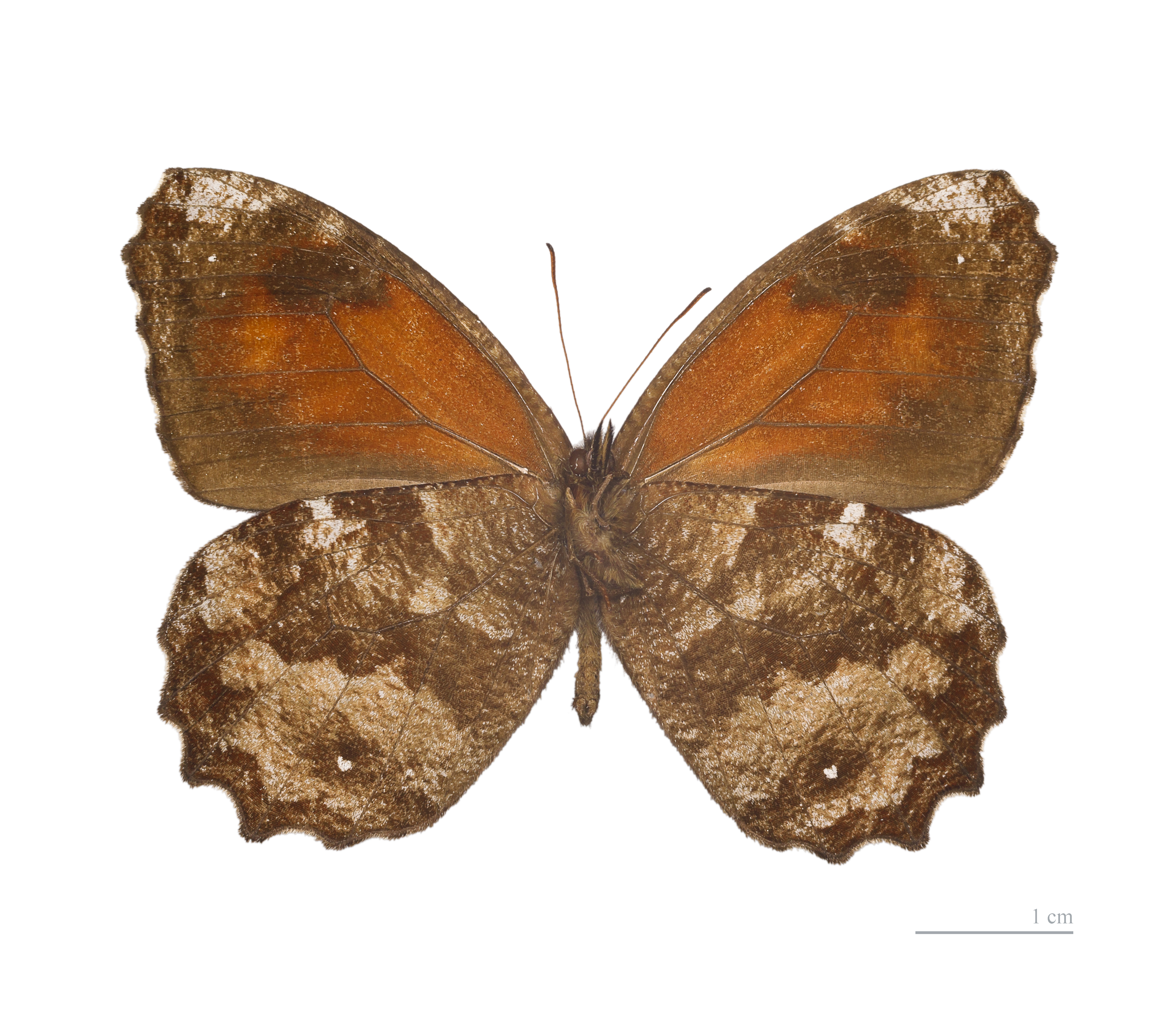
Pedaliodes hewitsoni

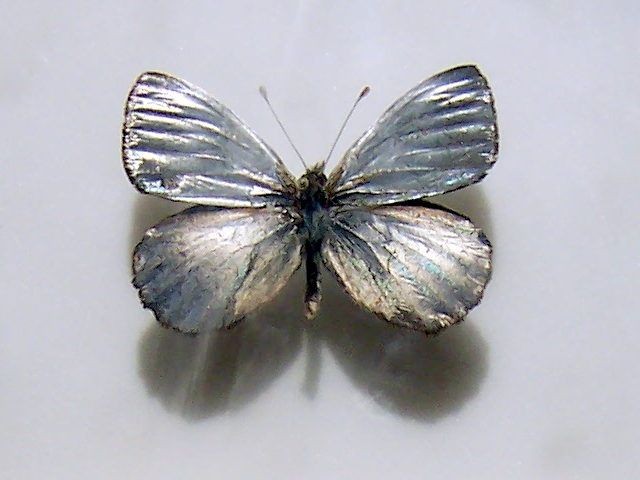
Argyrophorus argenteus is distributed in Argentina and Chile

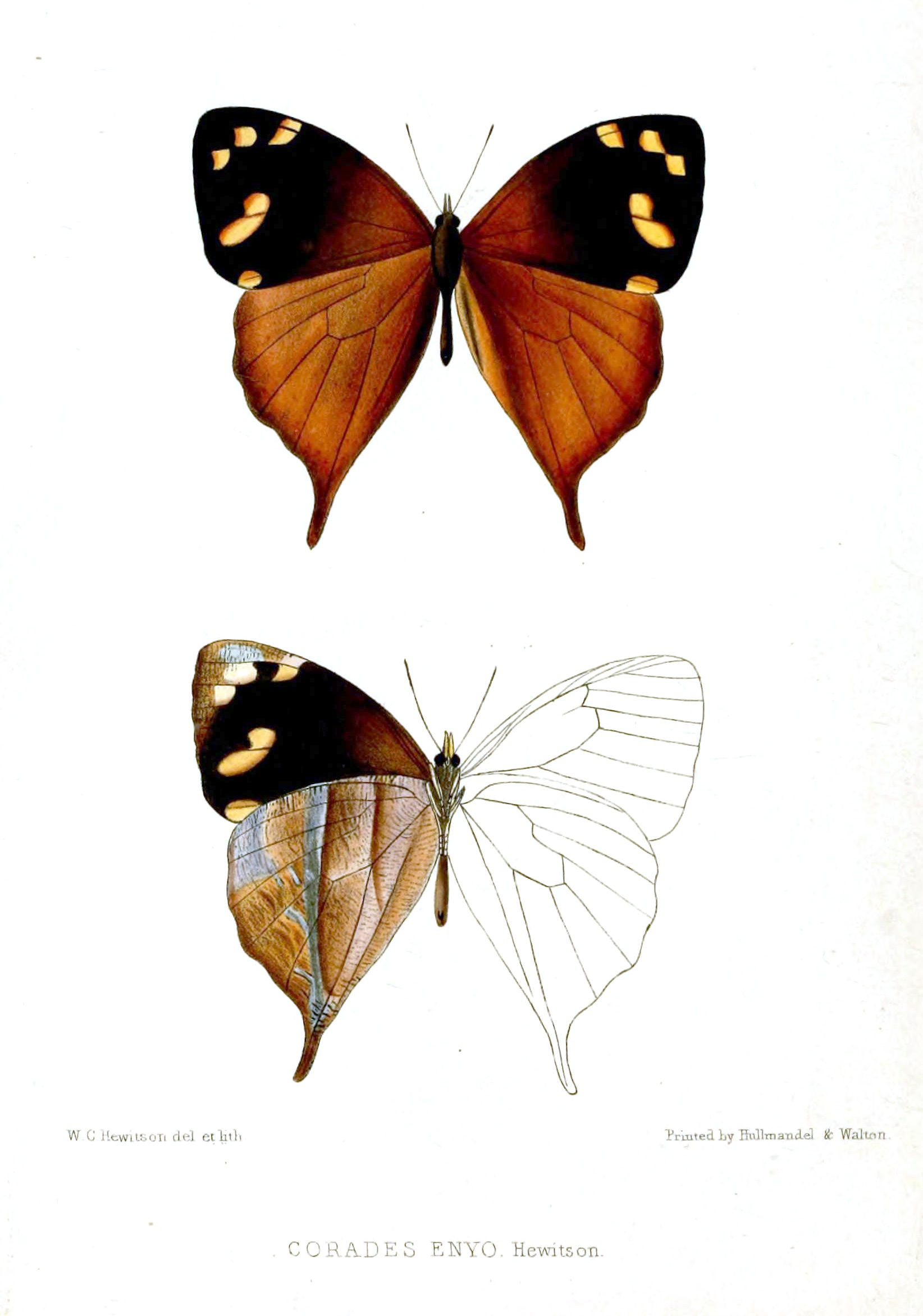
Corades enyo

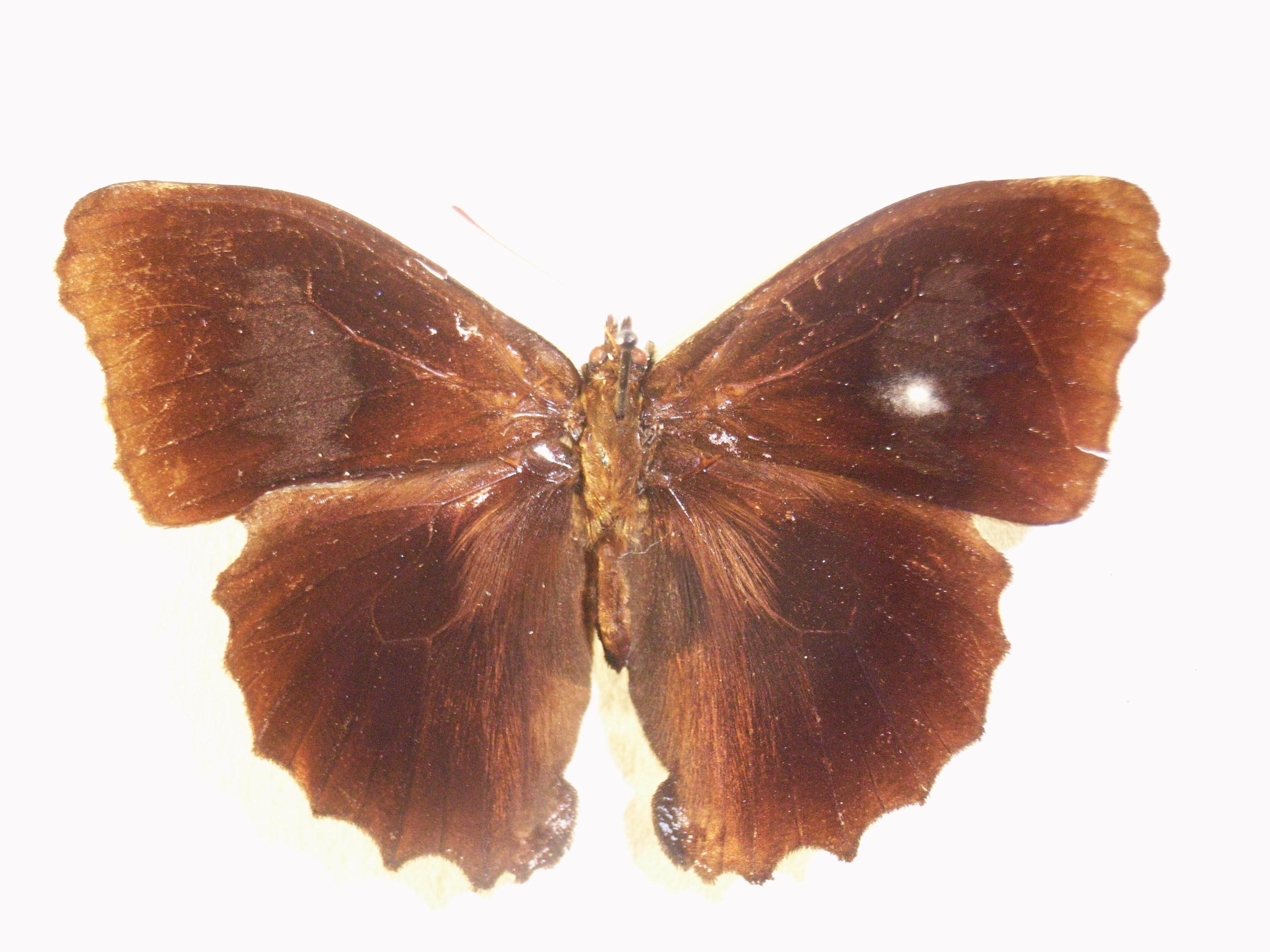
Steroma superba

==== Pronophilina sensu stricto ====
- Altopedaliodes Forster, 1964
- Antopedaliodes Forster, 1964
- Apexacuta Pyrcz, 2004
- Arhuaco Adams & Bernard, 1977
- Calisto (Hübner, 1823)
- Cheimas Thieme, 1907
- Corades Doubleday, [1849]
- Corderopedaliodes Forster, 1964
- Daedalma Hewitson, 1858
- Dangond Adams & Bernard, 1979
- Dioriste Thieme, 1907
- Drucina Butler, 1872
- Eretris Thieme, 1905
- Eteona Doubleday, 1848
- Foetterleia Viloria, 2004
- Junea Hemming, 1964
- Lasiophila C. & R.Felder, 1859
- Lymanopoda Westwood, 1851
- Mygona Thieme, 1907
- Neopedaliodes Viloria, Miller & Miller, 2004
- Oxeoschistus Butler, 1867
- Panyapedaliodes Forster, 1964
- Paramo Adams & Bernard, 1977
- Parapedaliodes Forster, 1964
- Pedaliodes Butler, 1867
- Pherepedaliodes Forster, 1964
- Physcopedaliodes Forster, 1964
- Praepedaliodes Forster, 1964
- Praepronophila Forster, 1964
- Pronophila Doubleday, [1849]
- Protopedaliodes Viloria & Pyrcz, 1994
- Pseudomaniola Röber, 1889
- Punapedaliodes Forster, 1964
- Redonda Adams & Bernard, 1981
- Sierrasteroma Adams & Bernard, 1977
- Steremnia Thieme, 1905
- Steroma Westwood, [1850]
- Steromapedaliodes Forster, 1964
- Thiemeia Weymer, 1912

==== Disputed, Pronophilina or Hypocystina (=Coenonymphina) ====
- Argyrophorus Blanchard, 1852
- Auca Hayward, 1953
- Chillanella Herrera, 1966
- Cosmosatyrus C. & R.Felder, 1867
- Elina Blanchard, 1852
- Etcheverrius Herrera, 1965
- Faunula C. & R.Felder, 1867
- Haywardella Herrera, 1966
- Homoeonympha C. & R.Felder, 1867 (including Erebina and Stygnolepis)
- Nelia Hayward, 1953
- Neomaenas Wallengren, 1858 (sometimes including Spinantenna)
- Neosatyrus Wallengren, 1858
- Palmaris Herrera, 1965
- Pampasatyrus Hayward, 1953 (including Pseudocercyonis)
- Pamperis Heimlich, 1959
- Punargentus Heimlich, 1963
- Quilaphoetosus Herrera, 1966
- Spinantenna Hayward, 1953 (sometimes included in Neomaenas)
- Tetraphlebia C. & R.Felder, 1867

==== Disputed, Pronophilina or Erebiina ====
- Diaphanos Adams & Bernard, 1981
- Ianussiusa Pyrcz & Viloria 2004
- Idioneurula Strand, 1932 (including Tamania Pyrcz, 1995)
- Manerebia Staudinger, 1897
- Neomaniola Hayward, 1949
- Sabatoga Staudinger, 1897
- Stuardosatyrus Herrera & Etcheverry, 1965

==== Previously in Pronophilina but of uncertain position ====
- Amphidecta Butler, 1867
- Gyrocheilus Butler, 1867
- Catargynnis Röber, 1892
- Druphila Pyrcz, 2004
- Proboscis Thieme, 1907

== Biology ==
The life cycle of pronophiline butterflies has been scarcely documented. Schultze described incomplete life histories for Pedaliodes phoenissa (Hewitson), Lymanopoda samius Westwood and Junea doraete (Hewitson). Other authors have observed oviposition on Chusquea (Poaceae) or other woody bamboos, or loosely over grass dominated vegetation. Early stages of several species found in Costa Rica were published by DeVries. Recently, life cycle description have been documented for Parapedaliodes parepa (Hewitson) in Ecuador, Pedaliodes zingara Viloria & Heredia in Colombia, Pedaliodes poesia (Hewitson) and Corades medeba Doubleday in Ecuador, and Daedalma dinias emma Pyrcz & Greeney and Daedalma rubroreducta Pyrcz & Willmott.

== Biotic associations ==
=== Host plants ===
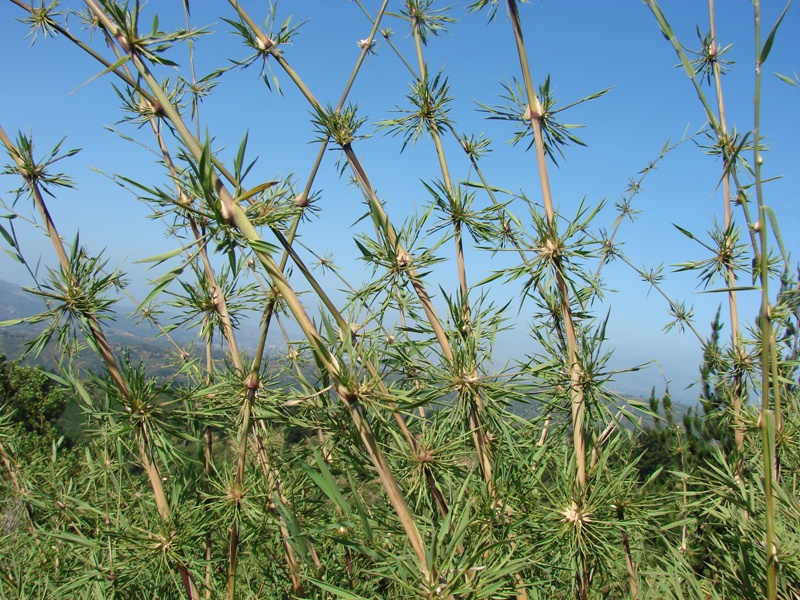
Chusquea cumingii

All reported host plants are in the family Poaceae, with the genus Chusquea featuring prominently, and a few records in Cynodon, Saccharum, Bambusa, Guada, Rhipidocladum, Merostachys and Zea, among others.

=== Parasitism ===
Parasitoids in the early stages of pronophiline butterflies have not been properly documented, although they might be locally important. Incidence of ectoparasitic Diptera (probably Ceratopogonidae) have been documented for seven species of the genera Corades, Lasiophila, Lymanopoda, Mygona and Pedaliodes.

=== Mimicry ===
There are 18 documented examples of convergent coloration patterns between coexisting pairs of pronophiline species from different genera (three examples), between pronophiline species and other satyrines (eight examples), and between pronophiline species and other butterflies or skippers (seven examples). Most examples involve species of Lymanopoda or Eretris. Some of these observations have been described as mimetic relationships, but the degree of resemblance is not so accurate as in other mimetic butterfly groups, there is no direct evidence of unpalatability of pronophiline butterflies, and no clear understanding of the ecological consequences of such resemblance.

== Diversity ==
Depending on the classification adopted, the pronophilini include between 592 and 711 species. This represents approximately 50–60% of the Neotropical, and 23–27% of the worldwide Satyrinae.

Most species have a geographically and altitudinally restricted distribution in the tropical and subtropical Andes, and other mountain ranges in Brazil, the Guayana Shield, Central America, and Mexico. The genus Calisto has a Caribbean distribution, and some other genera are distributed in Patagonia.

== Biogeography ==
The pronophilines have been involved in diverse biogeographical discussions that aim to explain their current distribution, diversity and endemism. The high diversity within the Pronophilina, and the distinctive speciation patterns in mountain and Caribbean taxa, has also motivated discussion about parapatric and sympatric speciation.

=== Origins ===
The affinities of the Pronophilina to other species groups within the specious Satyrinae suggest different interpretations about its origin. Viloria reviewed morphological characters and separated three groups that might have different phylogenetic and biogeographic affinities: a major group of 39 true Neotropical Pronophilina, including the genus Calisto with a Caribbean distribution, eight genera related to the Holarctic Erebiina, and 19 genera which he placed as Neotropical representatives of the otherwise Australasian Hypocystina. This grouping would suggest an amphi-Pacific distribution of the Hypocystina, and imply a Gondwanan origin according to a panbiogegraphic interpretations. This hypothesis was rebutted after a large phylogenetic analysis of the Satyrinae recovered a representative sample of pronophiline genera as a monophyletic group, and suggested a completely Neotropical, or at least, a common origin for the group. However, the relationships of the group remain unresolved, as subsequent work has found that at least two genera – Eretris, and the Caribbean Calisto—might be closer related to Holarctic Satyrines, but larger taxonomic sampling and a better integration of molecular and morphological data is needed to rule out analytical artifacts.

=== Speciation ===
It has been observed that most mountain species, especially in the species-rich genera close to Pedaliodes, have very narrow altitudinal ranges, and are restricted to one or few mountain ranges. This leads to high turn-over of species along altitudinal gradients within a mountain range, and high turn-over between ranges. Most species appear to be more closely related to those occupying a similar altitudinal range in neighboring mountains, than to the species below or above. A possible mechanism was proposed by Adams and extensively discussed by Viloria. This involves a series of alternative events of colonization and isolation that would be linked to repeated cycles of cold-wet and warm-dry climate (glaciations and interglaciation periods).

The genus Calisto also shows a distinctive radiation in the Caribbean, where it is the only representative of the Satyrinae. At least 54 named taxa have been recognized, most of them restricted to particular habitats in the island of Hispaniola, with fewer species in Cuba, Jamaica and Puerto Rico. The diversification of Calisto is referred to as an example of adaptive radiation into contrasting habitat types.
