= Redonda (butterfly) =

Scientific classification
- Domain: Eukaryota
- Kingdom: Animalia
- Phylum: Arthropoda
- Class: Insecta
- Order: Lepidoptera
- Family: Nymphalidae
- Subfamily: Satyrinae
- Tribe: Satyrini
- Subtribe: Pronophilina
- Genus: Redonda; Adams & Bernard, 1981

Species
- See text

Genus of butterflies

Redonda is a butterfly genus from the subfamily Satyrinae in the family Nymphalidae. The genus was erected by Michael Jan Adams and George Igor Bernard in 1981. It is endemic to the Cordillera de Merida páramo in Mérida, Venezuela. There are 10 known species, which are separated in distinct mountain ranges. Most species show some degree of sexual dimorphism in wing size, in the most extreme cases females show some degree of wing deformation which might point to incipient brachyptery.

== Taxonomy and nomenclature ==
The genus was described by Adams and Bernard in 1981 based on wing venation, male genitalia, wing color pattern and ecological characteristics of the type species Pedaliodes empetrus originally described by German entomologist Theodor Otto Thieme in 1905. These authors considered the genus to be monobasic, but recognized two subspecies, and suggested a close relationship with two other endemic genera in isolated mountain ranges.

Another species was described 20 years later, Redonda bordoni, from the southwest corner of the Cordillera de Mérida in Táchira. Other taxa were already recognized, but there were evident gaps in distribution and ecological data and no formal description was attempted until 2015. There are 10 currently recognized and described species:

- Redonda bolivari Adams & Bernard, 1981
- Redonda bordoni Viloria & Pyrcz, 2003
- Redonda castellana Viloria & Camacho, 2015
- Redonda centenaria Viloria & Camacho, 2015
- Redonda chiquinquirana Ferrer-Paris, 2015
- Redonda empetrus (Thieme, 1905)
- Redonda frailejona Ferrer-Paris & Costa, 2015
- Redonda lathraia Viloria & Camacho, 2015
- Redonda leukasmena Viloria & Camacho, 2015
- Redonda lossadana Ferrer-Paris, 2015

== Systematics and biogeography ==
The high species diversity of the subtribe Pronophilina has inspired multiple theories about speciation and diversification processes. Páramo-dwellers might represent ancient or relictual taxa from open low-land biomes that were isolated by the up-lifting of the Andes, or they might be the result of recent radiation due to specialization and isolation.

Preliminary analysis suggest that the genus is monophyletic, and the speciation sequence seems to correspond to the sequence of up-lifting and separation of the páramo biome in recent geological times.

== Conservation ==
R. bordoni is listed as endangered in Venezuela's Red Book of Fauna.
