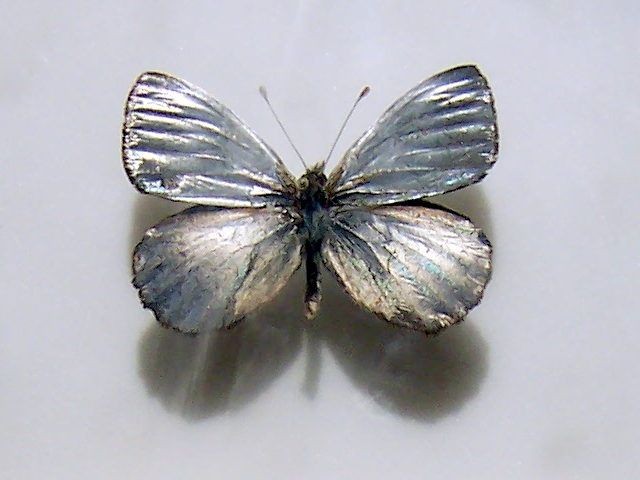
- Argyrophorus argenteus, type species

Scientific classification
- Kingdom: Animalia
- Phylum: Arthropoda
- Class: Insecta
- Order: Lepidoptera
- Family: Nymphalidae
- Tribe: Satyrini
- Genus: Argyrophorus; Blanchard, 1852

Type species
- Argyrophorus argenteus Blanchard, 1852

Species
- A. argenteus; A. blanchardi; and probably others, see text.

= Argyrophorus =

Genus of butterflies

Argyrophorus is a butterfly genus from the subfamily Satyrinae in the family Nymphalidae. It is distributed between Chile, Argentina and Peru. The systematic and circumscription of the genus is disputed.

== Taxonomy and systematics ==
Type species by monotypy is Argyrophorus argenteus Blanchard, 1852. Lamas recognised four species in the Neotropics, including the type species and three undescribed species.

Several species of southern temperate satyrinae have been assigned initially to the genus Argyrophorus, but taxonomic work during the 1950s and 1960s placed many of these in distinct genera. The recent description of a new species, with two distinct subspecies, raised the question of the validity of those genera (Neomaniola, Pampasatyrus, Pamperis, Punargenteus, Etcheverrius, Palmaris, Stuardosatyrus, Chilanella and Pseudocercyonis), but did not provided a resolved and conclusive synonymy for the group.

Traditionally Argyrophorus has been considered a representative of the subtribe Pronophilina, but Viloria found it to be closer related to the Hypocystina. This later arrangement has been challenged by phylogenetic analysis based on molecular data.
