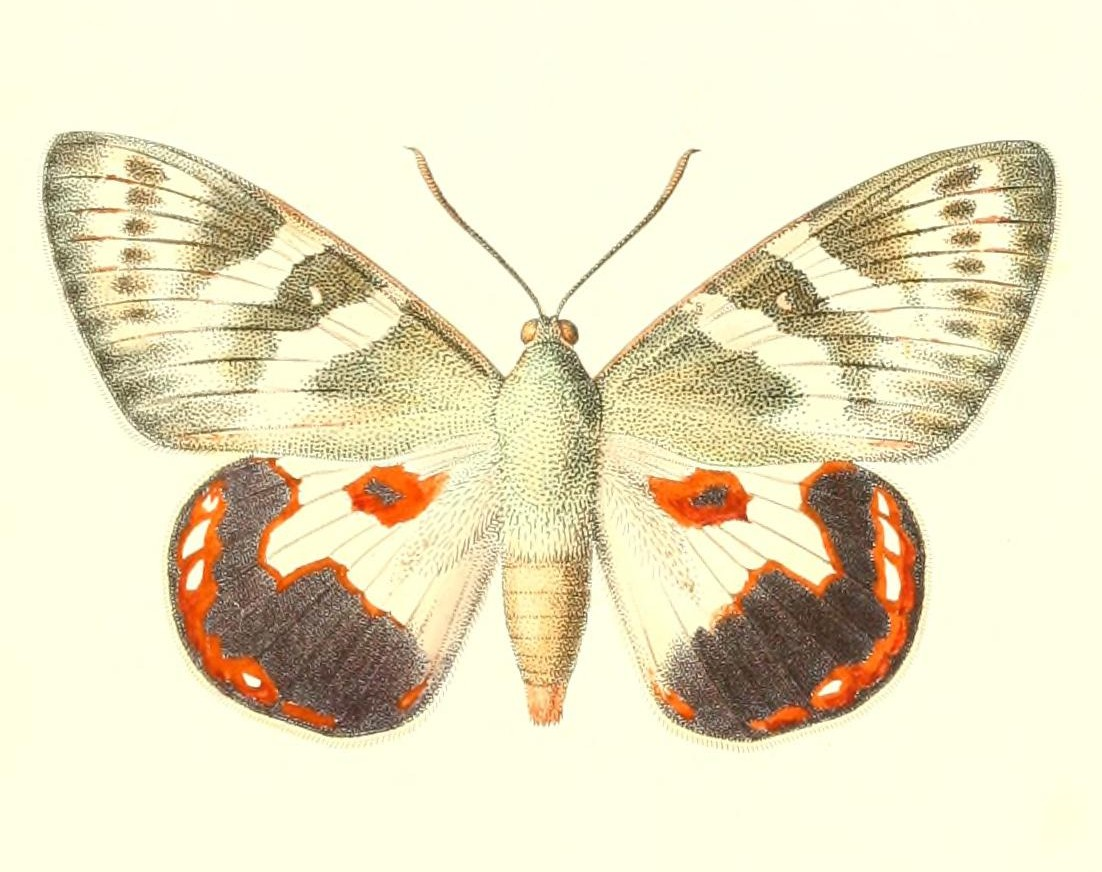
- Castnia juturna

Scientific classification
- Domain: Eukaryota
- Kingdom: Animalia
- Phylum: Arthropoda
- Class: Insecta
- Order: Lepidoptera
- Family: Castniidae
- Genus: Castnia; Fabricius, 1807

Synonyms
- Castinia Rafinesque, 1815; Acacerus Billberg, 1820; Elina Houlbert, 1918 (preocc. Blanchard, 1852)

= Castnia =

Genus of moths

Castnia is a genus of moths within the family Castniidae. It was described by Johan Christian Fabricius in 1807.

== Species ==
- Castnia estherae Miller, 1976
- Castnia eudesmia Gray, 1838
- Castnia fernandezi González, 1992
- Castnia invaria Walker, 1854
- Castnia juturna Hopffer, 1856
- Castnia lecerfi Dalla Torre, 1913
