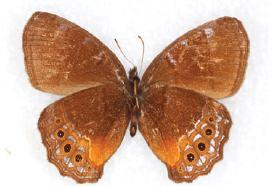
- Eretris decorata

Scientific classification
- Domain: Eukaryota
- Kingdom: Animalia
- Phylum: Arthropoda
- Class: Insecta
- Order: Lepidoptera
- Family: Nymphalidae
- Subtribe: Pronophilina
- Genus: Eretris; Thieme, 1905

= Eretris =

Genus of brush-footed butterflies

Eretris is a Neotropical butterfly genus in the family Nymphalidae. The genus was erected by Theodor Otto Thieme in 1905.

== Species ==
- Eretris apuleina Pyrcz, 2004
- Eretris apuleja (C. Felder & R. Felder, 1867)
- Eretris calisto (C. Felder & R. Felder, [1867])
- Eretris centralis Krüger, 1924
- Eretris decorata (C. Felder & R. Felder, 1867)
- Eretris depresissima Pyrcz, 1999
- Eretris encycla (C. Felder & R. Felder, 1867)
- Eretris hulda (Butler & H. Druce, 1872)
- Eretris lecromi Pyrcz, 1999
- Eretris maria (Schaus, 1920)
- Eretris mendoza Pyrcz, 2004
- Eretris ocellifera (C. Felder & R. Felder, 1867)
- Eretris oculata (C. Felder & R. Felder, [1867])
- Eretris porphyria (C. Felder & R. Felder, [1867])
- Eretris subpunctata (Grose-Smith & Kirby, 1895)
- Eretris subrufescens (Grose-Smith & Kirby, 1895)
- Eretris suzannae DeVries, 1980
- Eretris truncatina Pyrcz, 2004
