= Páramo (disambiguation) =

Páramo, from the Spanish word for "desolate territory", may refer to a variety of alpine tundra ecosystems located in the Andes Mountain Range, South America.

Páramo may also refer to:

- Páramo Leonés, a comarca in León Province, Spain
- Páramo (Teverga), a village in Asturias, Spain
- Páramo de Boedo, a municipality located in Palencia province, Castile-León, Spain
- Páramo del Sil, a municipality located in El Bierzo region, Castile-León, Spain
- O Páramo, a municipality in Galicia, Spain
- Páramo, Santander, a municipality in the Santander department, Colombia
- Pedro Páramo, a novel
  - Pedro Páramo (1967 film), Mexican film based on the novel
- Luz en el páramo, a 1953 Venezuelan film
- Paramo (butterfly), a genus of butterflies
- María Páramo (1953–2025), Colombian paleontologist and geologist

== See also ==
- Páramos (disambiguation)
