= Tamania =

Tamania may refer to:

- Tamania (butterfly), a genus of insects in the family Nymphalidae
- Tamania (plant), a genus of plants in the family Asteraceae
