= Pedaliodes cledonia =

Scientific classification
- Domain: Eukaryota
- Kingdom: Animalia
- Phylum: Arthropoda
- Class: Insecta
- Order: Lepidoptera
- Family: Nymphalidae
- Genus: Pedaliodes
- Species: P. cledonia

Binomial name
- Pedaliodes cledonia Thieme, 1905

Species of butterfly

Pedaliodes cledonia is a butterfly of the family Nymphalidae. It is found in Peru and Bolivia. The habitat consists of mid-elevation cloud forests.

== Subspecies ==
- Pedaliodes cledonia cledonia (southern Peru, Bolivia)
- Pedaliodes cledonia modesta Pyrcz, 2004 (northern Peru)
