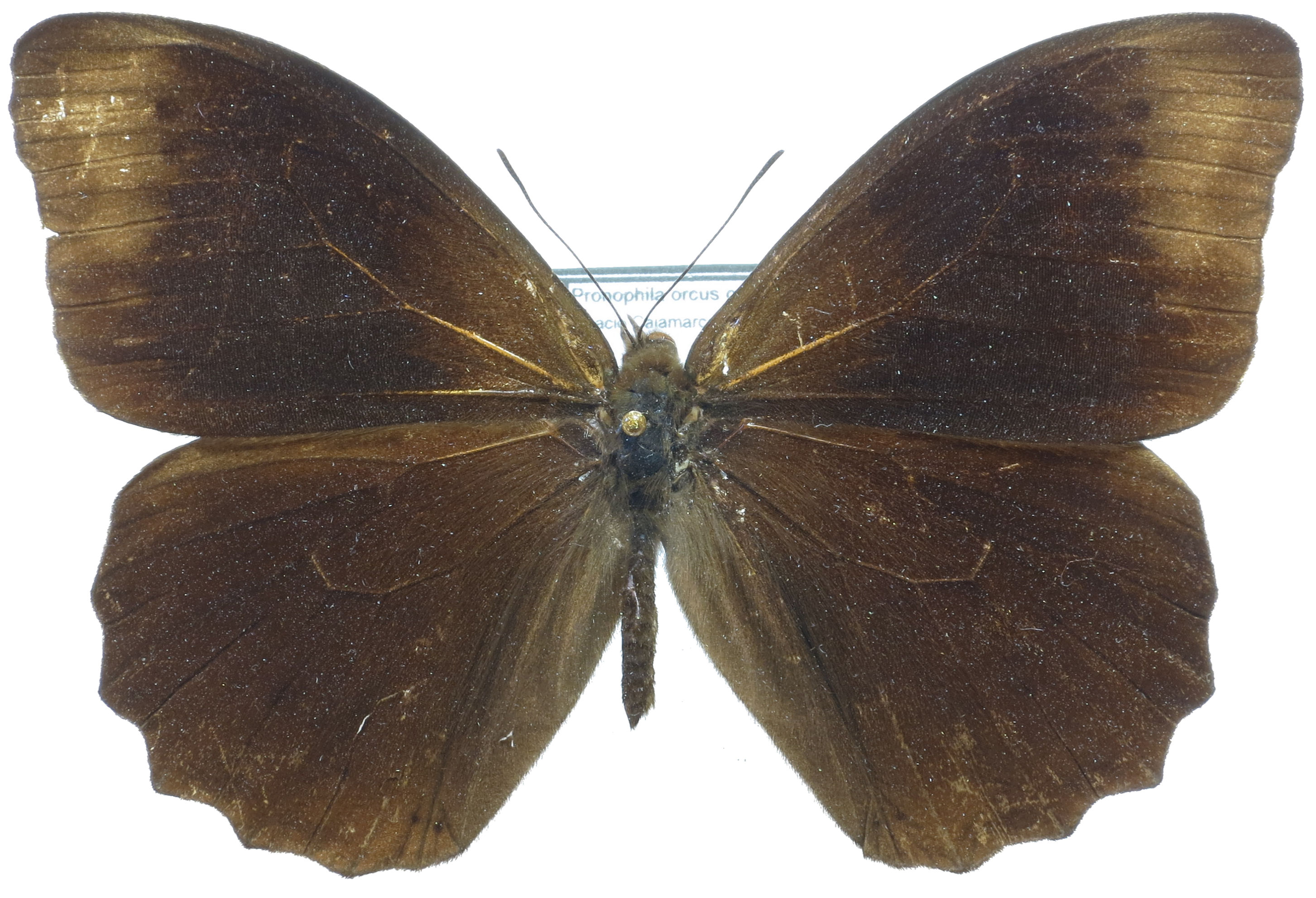
- Pronophila ocrus - Cajamarca, Peru

Scientific classification
- Domain: Eukaryota
- Kingdom: Animalia
- Phylum: Arthropoda
- Class: Insecta
- Order: Lepidoptera
- Family: Nymphalidae
- Subtribe: Pronophilina
- Genus: Pronophila; Doubleday, 1849

Species
- See text

Synonyms
- Mygona Westwood, [1851]

= Pronophila =

Genus of brush-footed butterflies

Pronophila is a genus of butterflies from the subfamily Satyrinae in the family Nymphalidae. The species in the genus Pronophila occur in South America, including Peru, Venezuela, and Ecuador.

== Species ==
Listed alphabetically:

- Pronophila attali
- Pronophila bernardi
- Pronophila cordillera
- Pronophila colocasia
- Pronophila cuchillaensis
- Pronophila epidipnis
- Pronophila intercidona
- Pronophila isobelae – Isobel's butterfly, originally Pronophila benevola
- Pronophila juliani
- Pronophila margarita
- Pronophila obscura
- Pronophila orcus
- Pronophila rosenbergi
- Pronophila thelebe
- Pronophila timanthes
- Pronophila tremocrata
- Pronophila unifasciata
