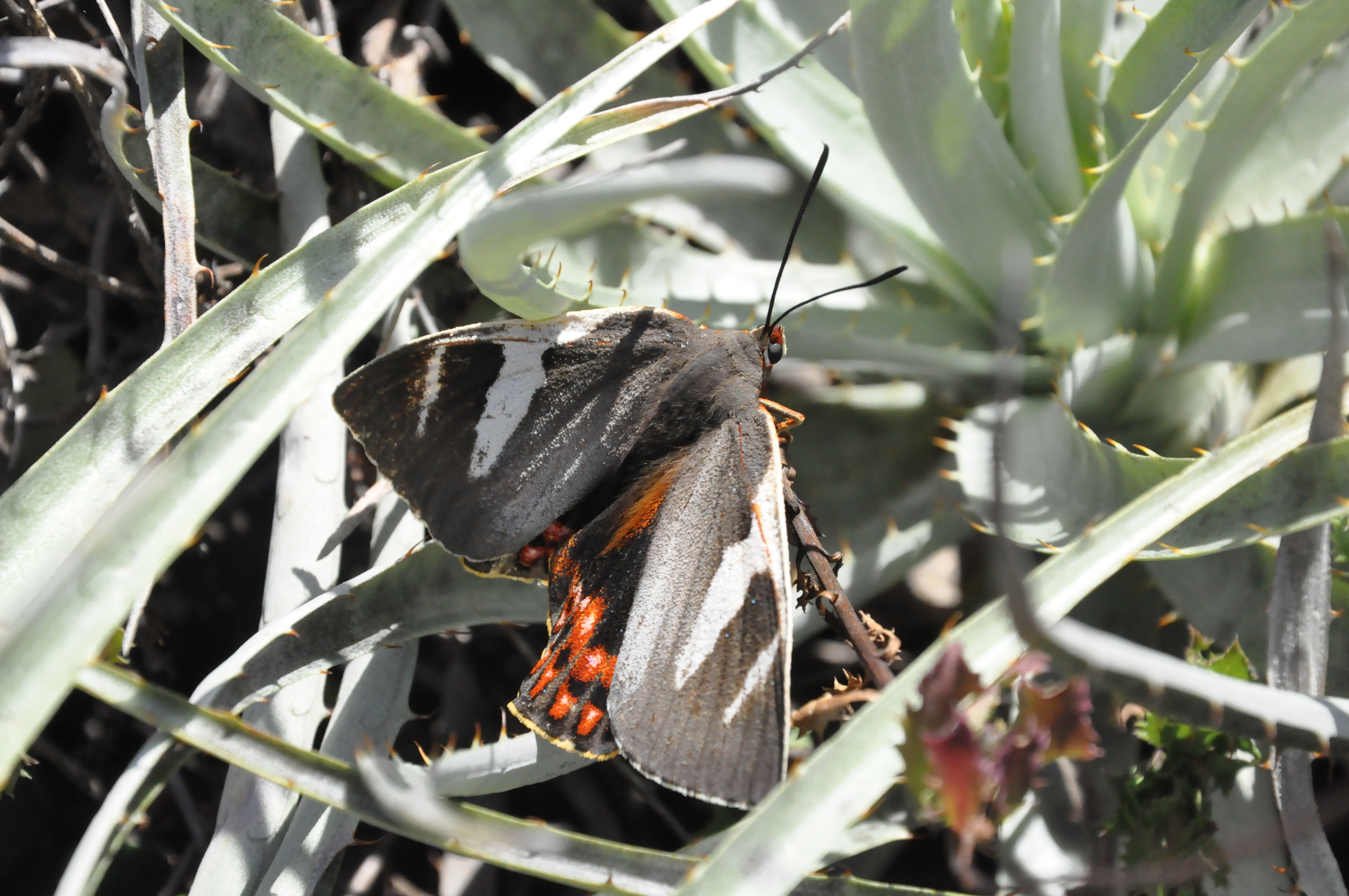

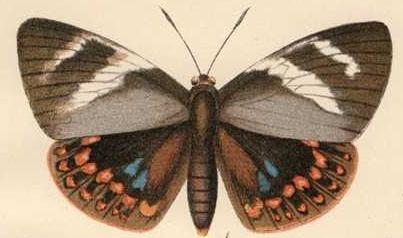

Scientific classification
- Kingdom: Animalia
- Phylum: Arthropoda
- Class: Insecta
- Order: Lepidoptera
- Family: Castniidae
- Genus: Castnia
- Species: C. eudesmia

Binomial name
- Castnia eudesmia Gray, 1838

Synonyms
- Castnia eudesmia omissa Pfeiffer, 1915; Castnia var. chilena Houlbert, 1918

= Castnia eudesmia =

Species of moth

Castnia eudesmia is a moth in the Castniidae family. It is found in Chile.
