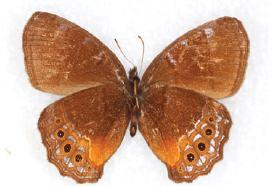

Scientific classification
- Domain: Eukaryota
- Kingdom: Animalia
- Phylum: Arthropoda
- Class: Insecta
- Order: Lepidoptera
- Family: Nymphalidae
- Genus: Eretris
- Species: E. decorata

Binomial name
- Eretris decorata (C. & R. Felder, 1867)

Synonyms
- Pronophila decorata C. & R. Felder, [1867]; Eretris porphyria decorata

= Eretris decorata =

Species of butterfly

Eretris decorata is a butterfly of the family Nymphalidae. It is found in Colombia.

The larvae feed on various species of bunch grass.

== Taxonomy ==
Some authors treat it as a subspecies of Eretris porphyria.
