= Pronophila isobelae =

Isobel's butterfly

Scientific classification
- Domain: Eukaryota
- Kingdom: Animalia
- Phylum: Arthropoda
- Class: Insecta
- Order: Lepidoptera
- Family: Nymphalidae
- Genus: Pronophila
- Species: P. isobelae

Binomial name
- Pronophila isobelae Pyrcz, 2000

Synonyms
- Pronophila benevola; Pronophila isobelae benevola

Species of butterfly

Pronophila isobelae, or Isobel's butterfly, is a Satyrinae butterfly that is found in Ecuador.

Discovered by World Wildlife Fund conservationist Paul Toyne in 1998, it was initially named Pronophila benevola.

The WWF held a competition to name the butterfly, and the species was named after the winner Isobel Talks (being named Pronophila isobelae).

As of July 2011, there have only been six sightings of the male of the species, and no confirmed sightings of the female.

== Appearance ==
=== Male ===
- Wing colouring: dark brown and chestnut
- Wingspan: 7.4 centimetres (2.9 in)
- Markings: bright white tip on forewings

=== Female ===
- Not known

== See also ==
- Satyrinae
- Nymphalidae
