= Castnia lecerfi =

Scientific classification
- Domain: Eukaryota
- Kingdom: Animalia
- Phylum: Arthropoda
- Class: Insecta
- Order: Lepidoptera
- Family: Castniidae
- Genus: Castnia
- Species: C. lecerfi

Binomial name
- Castnia lecerfi Dalla Torre, 1913

Synonyms
- Castnia wagneri Le Cerf, 1911 (preocc. Buchecker, [1880])

Species of moth

Castnia lecerfi is a moth in the Castniidae family. It is found in Argentina.
