= Castnia estherae =

Scientific classification
- Domain: Eukaryota
- Kingdom: Animalia
- Phylum: Arthropoda
- Class: Insecta
- Order: Lepidoptera
- Family: Castniidae
- Genus: Castnia
- Species: C. estherae

Binomial name
- Castnia estherae Miller, 1976

Species of moth

Castnia estherae is a moth in the Castniidae family. It is found in Mexico.

The length of the forewings is about 47 mm.

== Etymology ==
The species is named for Sra. Esther Arias de Escalante who collected the holotype.
