= Castnia fernandezi =

Scientific classification
- Domain: Eukaryota
- Kingdom: Animalia
- Phylum: Arthropoda
- Class: Insecta
- Order: Lepidoptera
- Family: Castniidae
- Genus: Castnia
- Species: C. fernandezi

Binomial name
- Castnia fernandezi González, 1992

Species of moth

Castnia fernandezi is a moth in the Castniidae family. It is found in Venezuela (Amazonas State).

The length of the forewings is 38–40 mm.
