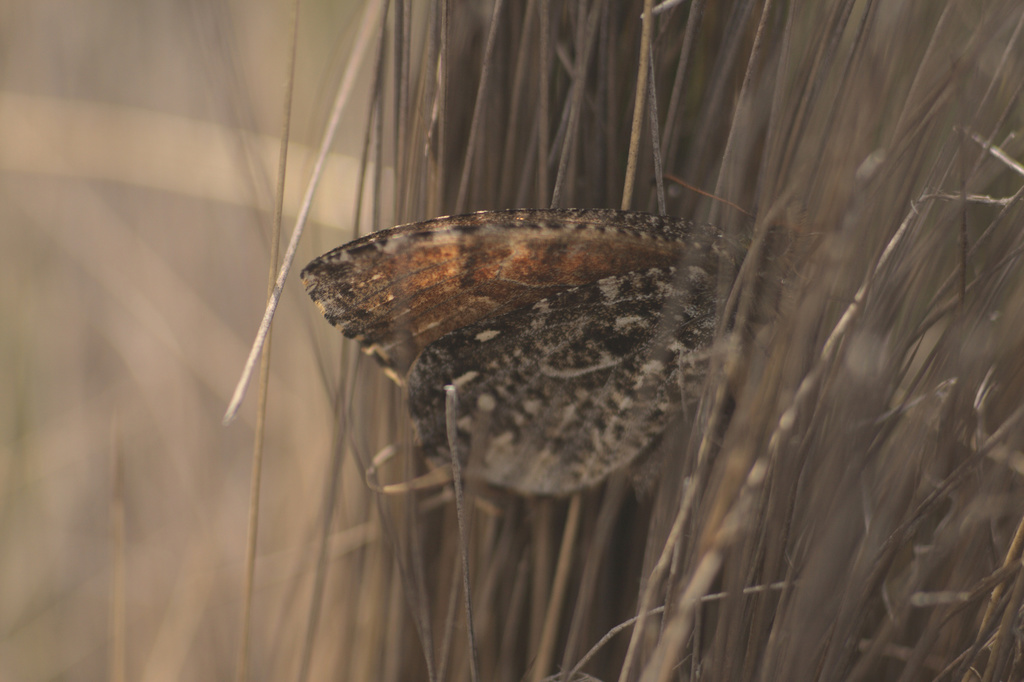

Scientific classification
- Kingdom: Animalia
- Phylum: Arthropoda
- Class: Insecta
- Order: Lepidoptera
- Family: Nymphalidae
- Genus: Redonda
- Species: R. chiquinquirana

Binomial name
- Redonda chiquinquirana Ferrer-Paris, 2015

= Redonda chiquinquirana =

Species of butterfly

Redonda chiquinquirana is a butterfly species from the subfamily Satyrinae in the family Nymphalidae. It is endemic from the Cordillera de Merida páramo in Venezuela, in northern South America. R. chiquinquirana show high degree of sexual dimorphism in wing size, in which females show some degree of wing deformation which might point to incipient brachyptery.

== Taxonomy and nomenclature ==
Populations of this species were often referred to as an undescribed subspecies of Redonda empetrus.

== Conservation ==
Redonda chiquinquirana is listed as endangered in Venezuela's Red Book of Fauna.
