= Castnia invaria =

Scientific classification
- Kingdom: Animalia
- Phylum: Arthropoda
- Class: Insecta
- Order: Lepidoptera
- Family: Castniidae
- Genus: Castnia
- Species: C. invaria

Binomial name
- Castnia invaria Walker, 1854

Synonyms
- Castnia penelope Schaufuss, 1870; Castnia eudelechia Druce, 1893; Castnia icaroides Houlbert, 1917; Castnia jordani Houlbert, 1917; Castnia (Elina) icarus penelope ab. endelechiodes Rothschild, 1919; Castnia minerva Krüger, 1926; Castnia icarus dividuus Röber, 1928; Castnia (Elvina[sic]) icarus f. hoehni Jörgensen, 1930; Castnia icarus patquiensis Breyer, 1943; Castnia icarus trinitatis Lathy, 1925; Castnia invaria volitans Lamas, 1995; Papilio icarus Cramer, [1775]; Castnia f. paraguayensis Strand, 1913; Castnia juturna paraguayensis

Species of moth

Castnia invaria is a moth in the family Castniidae. It is found in South America.

The length of the forewings is 62–80 mm.

The larvae feed on Ananas species (including Ananas comosus) and wild terrestrial Bromeliaceae species.

== Subspecies ==
- Castnia invaria invaria (Brazil: Rio de Janeiro)
- Castnia invaria penelope Schaufuss, 1870 (Amazon basin, Orinoco Basin, from Venezuela and the Guianas to Paraguay, Chile and Argentina)
- Castnia invaria trinitatis Lathy, 1925 (Trinidad)
- Castnia invaria volitans Lamas, 1995 (Surinam, Venezuela, eastern Colombia)
