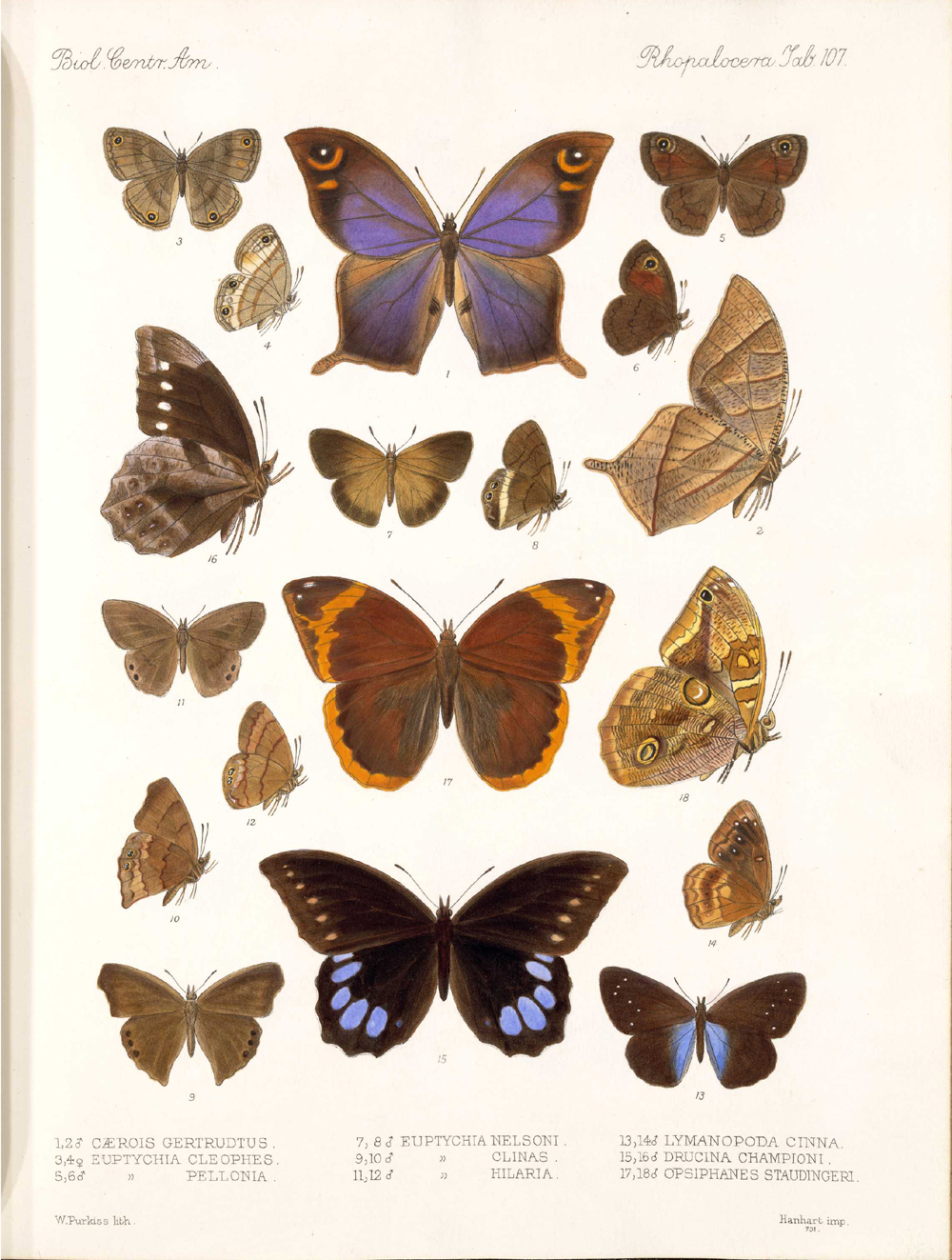
- Drucina championi, figures 15 and 16

Scientific classification
- Domain: Eukaryota
- Kingdom: Animalia
- Phylum: Arthropoda
- Class: Insecta
- Order: Lepidoptera
- Family: Nymphalidae
- Subtribe: Pronophilina
- Genus: Drucina; Butler, 1872

= Drucina =

Genus of brush-footed butterflies

Drucina is a Neotropical butterfly genus in the family Nymphalidae.

== Species ==
- Drucina championi Godman & Salvin, [1881]
- Drucina leonata Butler, 1872
