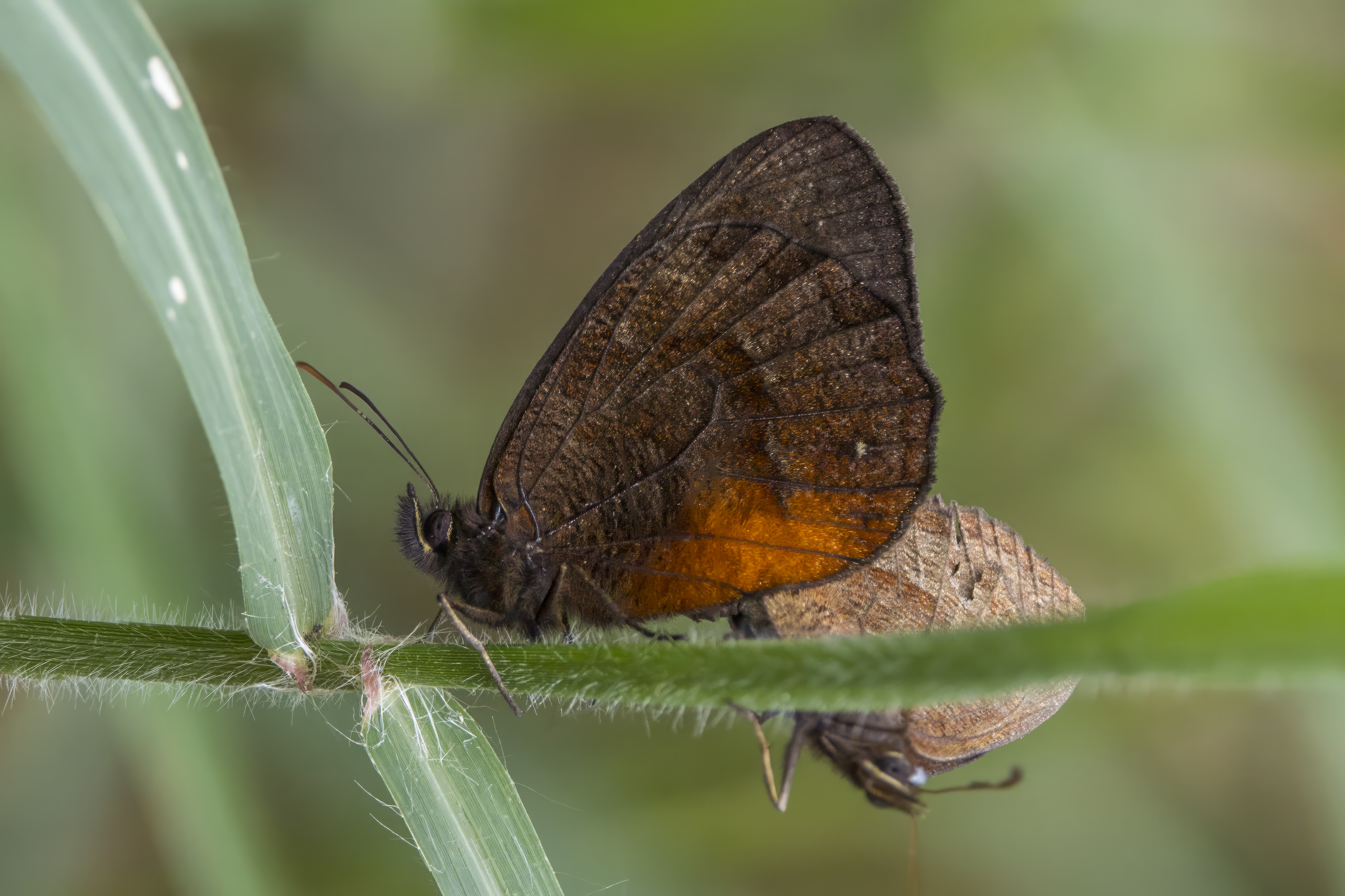
- Montagna mountain satyr P. montagna, mating, Colombia

Scientific classification
- Domain: Eukaryota
- Kingdom: Animalia
- Phylum: Arthropoda
- Class: Insecta
- Order: Lepidoptera
- Family: Nymphalidae
- Subtribe: Pronophilina
- Genus: Pedaliodes; Butler, 1867

= Pedaliodes =

Genus of insects

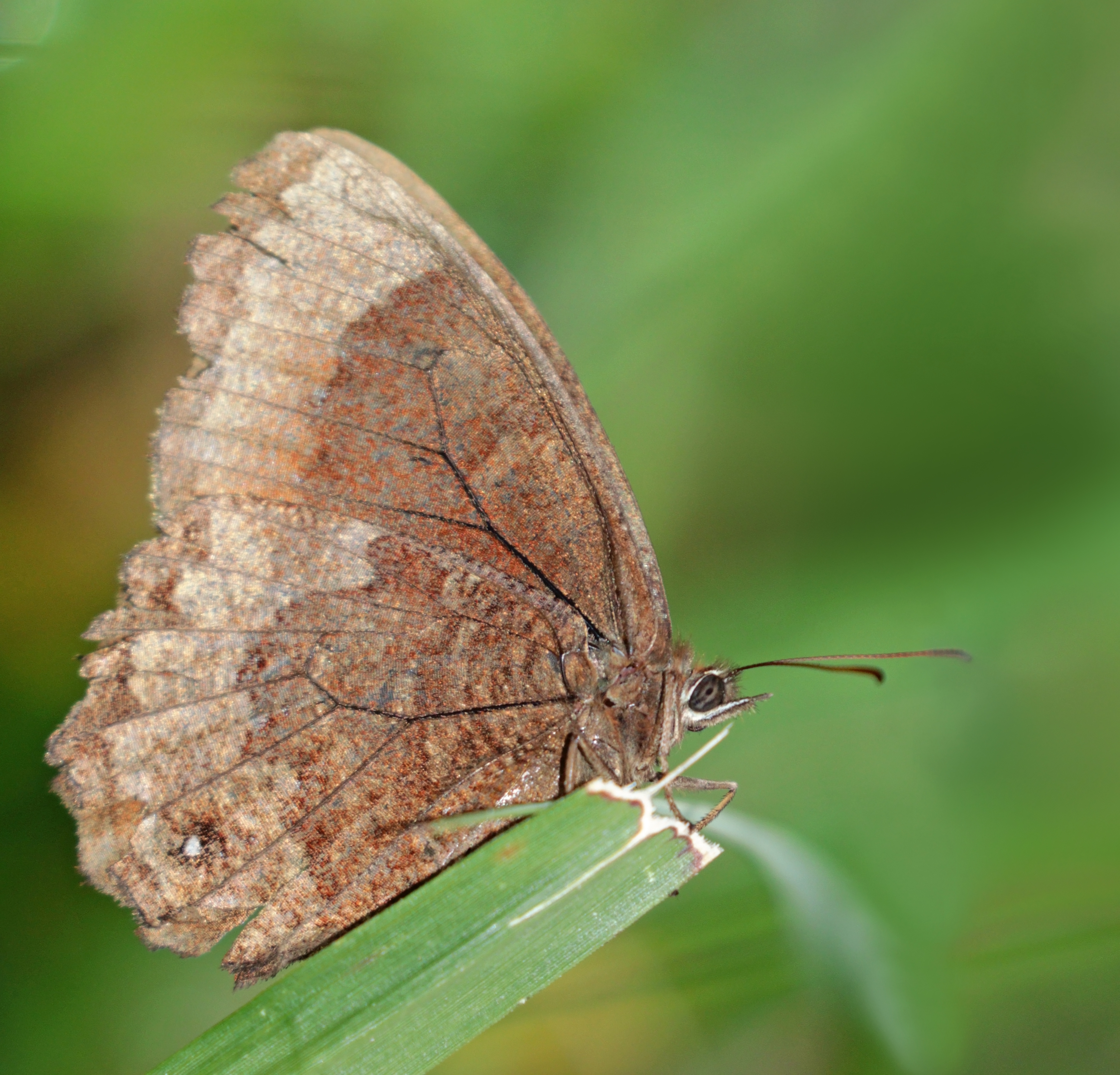
Dejected pedalio Pedaliodes dejecta dejecta Panama

Pedaliodes is a genus of butterflies from the subfamily Satyrinae in the family Nymphalidae found from Mexico to South America. The genus was erected by Arthur Gardiner Butler in 1867.

== Species ==
Listed alphabetically: (There are additional species which have not yet been assigned binomial names.)

- Pedaliodes acjanaco
- Pedaliodes ackeryi
- Pedaliodes adamsi
- Pedaliodes albicilia
- Pedaliodes albutia
- Pedaliodes alusana
- Pedaliodes amafania
- Pedaliodes ampayana
- Pedaliodes ampulla
- Pedaliodes anchiphilonis
- Pedaliodes antigua
- Pedaliodes antulla
- Pedaliodes arena
- Pedaliodes arnotti
- Pedaliodes arturi
- Pedaliodes asconia – Thieme's satyr
- Pedaliodes auraria
- Pedaliodes aureola
- Pedaliodes auristriga
- Pedaliodes baccara
- Pedaliodes balnearia
- Pedaliodes bernardi
- Pedaliodes boettgeri
- Pedaliodes brea
- Pedaliodes caeca
- Pedaliodes canela
- Pedaliodes cebolleta
- Pedaliodes cendreata
- Pedaliodes cesarense
- Pedaliodes chaconi
- Pedaliodes chrysotaenia
- Pedaliodes circumducta
- Pedaliodes cledonia
- Pedaliodes coca
- Pedaliodes costipunctata
- Pedaliodes cremera
- Pedaliodes croizatorum
- Pedaliodes daulis
- Pedaliodes dejecta – dejected/dejecta satyr
- Pedaliodes demarmelsi
- Pedaliodes demathani
- Pedaliodes derisoris
- Pedaliodes diuna
- Pedaliodes dominicae
- Pedaliodes dracula
- Pedaliodes empusa
- Pedaliodes ereiba
- Pedaliodes erschoffi
- Pedaliodes exanima
- Pedaliodes fassli
- Pedaliodes ferratilis
- Pedaliodes fuscata
- Pedaliodes garleppi
- Pedaliodes guicana
- Pedaliodes gustavi
- Pedaliodes hardyi
- Pedaliodes hebena
- Pedaliodes hewitsoni
- Pedaliodes hopfferi – sunburst satyr
- Pedaliodes illimania
- Pedaliodes japhleta
- Pedaliodes jelskii
- Pedaliodes jozefi
- Pedaliodes kruegeri
- Pedaliodes leucocheilus
- Pedaliodes lithochalcis
- Pedaliodes manis – Manis satyr
- Pedaliodes manneja
- Pedaliodes maruda
- Pedaliodes melaleuca
- Pedaliodes melvillei
- Pedaliodes minabilis
- Pedaliodes misericordiosa
- Pedaliodes montagna – Montagna mountain satyr
- Pedaliodes morenoi
- Pedaliodes napaea
- Pedaliodes negreti
- Pedaliodes niveonota
- Pedaliodes obscura
- Pedaliodes obstructa
- Pedaliodes occulta
- Pedaliodes ornata
- Pedaliodes pacifica
- Pedaliodes pactyes
- Pedaliodes paeonides
- Pedaliodes palaepolis
- Pedaliodes pallantis
- Pedaliodes palpita
- Pedaliodes pammenes
- Pedaliodes paneis
- Pedaliodes panthides
- Pedaliodes parma
- Pedaliodes parranda
- Pedaliodes patizathes
- Pedaliodes pausia
- Pedaliodes pedacia
- Pedaliodes pelinaea
- Pedaliodes pelinna
- Pedaliodes peregrina
- Pedaliodes perisades
- Pedaliodes peruda
- Pedaliodes peruviana
- Pedaliodes petri
- Pedaliodes peucestas – Peucestas satyr
- Pedaliodes phaea
- Pedaliodes phaedra
- Pedaliodes phaeina
- Pedaliodes phaeinomorpha
- Pedaliodes phanoclea
- Pedaliodes phantasia
- Pedaliodes phazania – galaxy satyr
- Pedaliodes pheres
- Pedaliodes pheretias
- Pedaliodes philonis
- Pedaliodes phoenissa
- Pedaliodes phoenix
- Pedaliodes phrasa
- Pedaliodes phrasicla
- Pedaliodes phrasiclea
- Pedaliodes phrasis
- Pedaliodes phthiotis
- Pedaliodes pilaloensis
- Pedaliodes piletha
- Pedaliodes pimienta
- Pedaliodes piscolabis
- Pedaliodes pisonia
- Pedaliodes plotina
- Pedaliodes poema
- Pedaliodes poesia
- Pedaliodes poetica
- Pedaliodes polla
- Pedaliodes pollonia
- Pedaliodes polusca
- Pedaliodes pomponia
- Pedaliodes porcia
- Pedaliodes porima
- Pedaliodes porina
- Pedaliodes praxia
- Pedaliodes praxithea
- Pedaliodes proculeja
- Pedaliodes proerna
- Pedaliodes prosa
- Pedaliodes prytanis
- Pedaliodes puracana
- Pedaliodes pylas
- Pedaliodes ralphi
- Pedaliodes roraimae
- Pedaliodes rudnyi
- Pedaliodes rumba
- Pedaliodes scydmaena
- Pedaliodes simmias
- Pedaliodes simpla
- Pedaliodes simplissima
- Pedaliodes socorrae
- Pedaliodes sonata
- Pedaliodes sophismata
- Pedaliodes spina
- Pedaliodes stuebeli
- Pedaliodes suspiro
- Pedaliodes syleus
- Pedaliodes sztolcmani
- Pedaliodes tabaconas
- Pedaliodes terramaris
- Pedaliodes thiemei
- Pedaliodes transmontana
- Pedaliodes triaria
- Pedaliodes tucca
- Pedaliodes tyro
- Pedaliodes tyrrheoides
- Pedaliodes tyrrheus
- Pedaliodes uaniuna
- Pedaliodes uncus
- Pedaliodes uniformis
- Pedaliodes uniplaga
- Pedaliodes vallenata
- Pedaliodes wilhelmi
- Pedaliodes woytkowskii
- Pedaliodes xanthosphenisca
- Pedaliodes yutajeana
- Pedaliodes yuvinka
- Pedaliodes zingara
- Pedaliodes zuleta
