= Páramos =

Páramos may refer to:

- Páramos (comarca), a comarca in Spain
- Páramos, Venezuela, a region in the Cordillera de Mérida, Venezuela

== See also ==
- Páramo (disambiguation)
