= Cordillera de Merida páramo =

Ecoregion in the Andes mountain range of Venezuela

Cordillera de Merida páramo (NT1004)
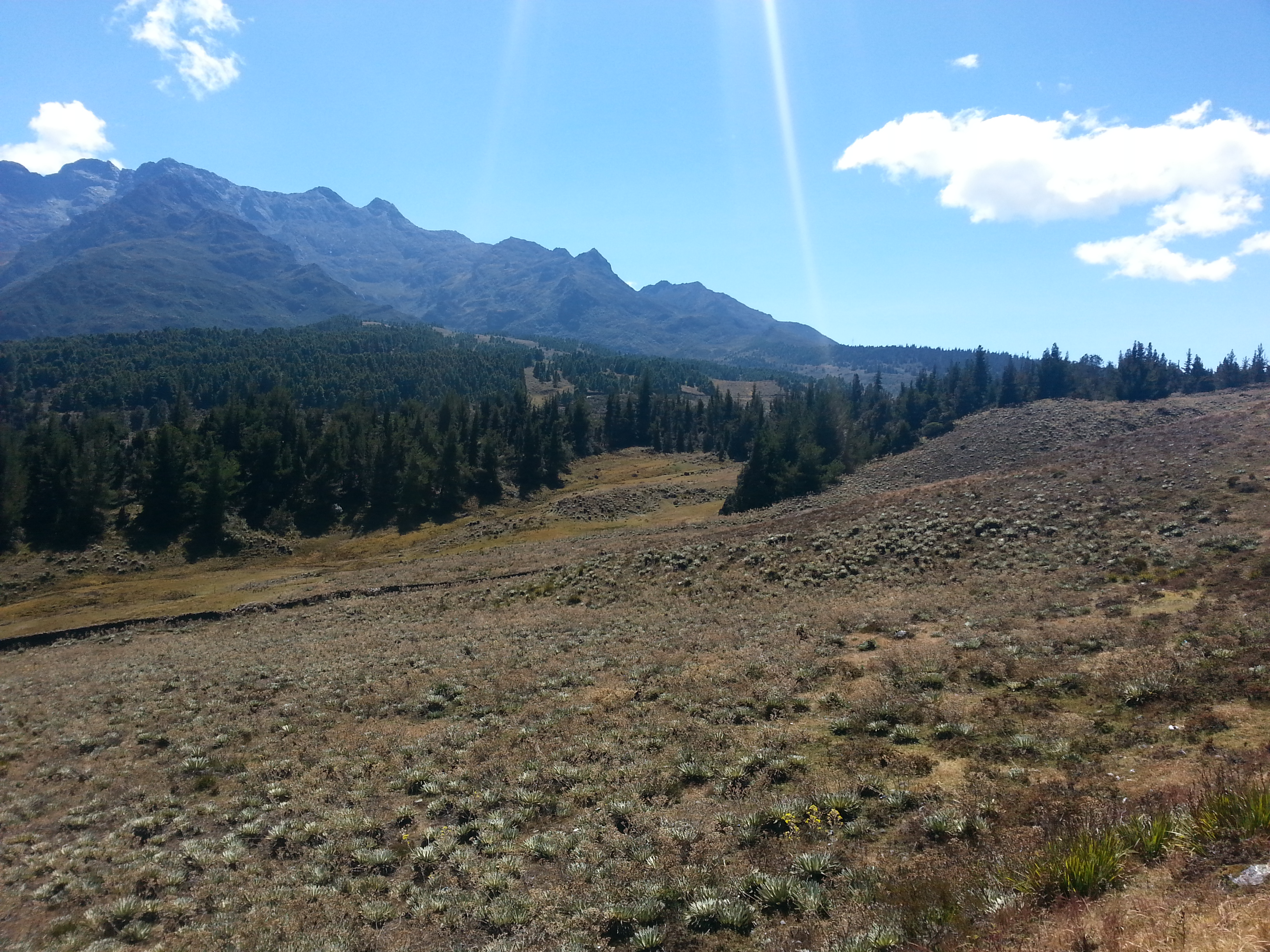
- Páramo in the Cordillera de Merida

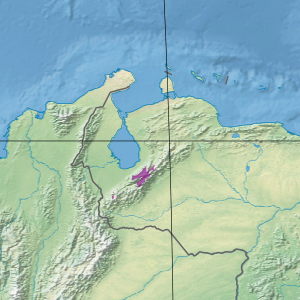
- Ecoregion territory (in purple)

Ecology
- Realm: Neotropical
- Biome: Montane grasslands and shrublands

Geography
- Area: 2,849 km^{2} (1,100 sq mi)
- Country: Venezuela
- Coordinates: 8.849°N 70.846°W
- Climate type: ETH: Alpine tundra

The Cordillera de Merida páramo (NT1004) is an ecoregion containing páramo (high moorland) vegetation above the treeline in the Andes mountain range of Venezuela. The isolated habitat has many endemic species. It is relatively stable and intact.

== Geography ==
=== Location ===
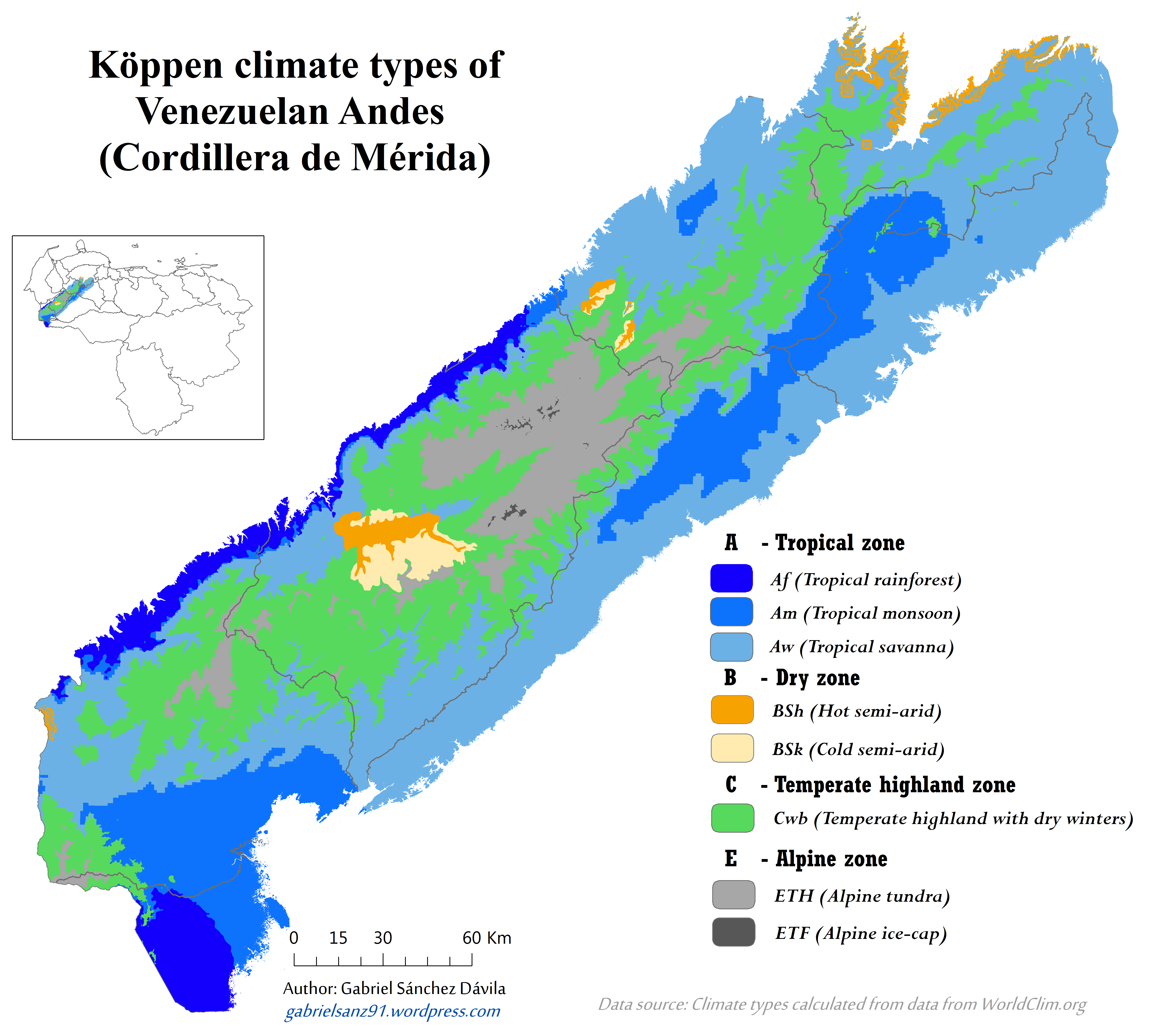
Köppen climate zones of the Cordillera de Merida

The Cordillera de Merida páramo is to the south of the Lake Maracaibo in the Cordillera de Mérida massif of northeastern Venezuela. It has an area of 284,898 hectares (704,000 acres). It is surrounded by the Venezuelan Andes montane forests ecoregion.

=== Terrain ===
Páramos in the southwest of the Cordillera de Merida include Batalló at 3,913 metres (12,838 ft) above sea level and Nariño at 3,517 metres (11,539 ft). The highest point in the central section is the Piedras Blancas peak at 4,729 metres (15,515 ft), surrounded by extensive páramos, glaciers and lakes. From the Piedras Blancas páramo the land descends to the Mucuchíes páramo at 4,077 metres (13,376 ft), then continues to gradually descend towards the northeast.

=== Climate ===
The Köppen climate classification is "ETH": Alpine tundra, with no month with an average temperature in excess of 10 °C (50 °F). Where the Northern Andean páramo is generally humid throughout the year with moisture delivered in the form of rain, clouds and fog as air masses are lifted up over the mountains, the Cordillera de Merida páramo is similar to the Costa Rican páramo and Santa Marta páramo, where the trade winds create a distinct dry season. The dominant winds blow northwest from the Amazon region, with a rainy season from around March to November.

== Ecology ==
The Cordillera de Merida páramo ecoregion is in the neotropical realm, in the montane grasslands and shrublands biome. The ecoregion is part of the Northern Andean Paramo global ecoregion, which also includes the Cordillera Central páramo, Santa Marta páramo and Northern Andean páramo terrestrial ecoregions. The plants and animals are adapted to the cold, dry conditions of the high peaks. There is a high level of local endemism, particularly on the more isolated peaks.

=== Origins ===
The Andes began to rise in the Miocene epoch, but in the north did not reach their present height until the Pliocene during a period of strong volcanic activity between four and five million years ago. This was the period when land rose above the tree line and the protopáramo vegetation was formed with new species of the Poaceae, Cyperecear, Arteraceae, Ericaceae and other families. During the later parts of the Quaternary epoch a series of short, cold and dry glacial periods alternated with warmer and more humid interglacial periods. The páramo belts moved lower and joined together in the cold periods, and moved higher into unconnected enclaves when the temperatures rose.

The result is a mix of species of tropical and boreal origin with the same genera found in most páramos, but with many endemic species in the individual páramos. The Cordillera de Mérida is the oldest part of the northern Andes, and has a large connected corridor of páramo. The range is probably where most of the páramo flora of tropical origin developed, then migrated south into Colombia during cold glacial periods.

=== Flora ===
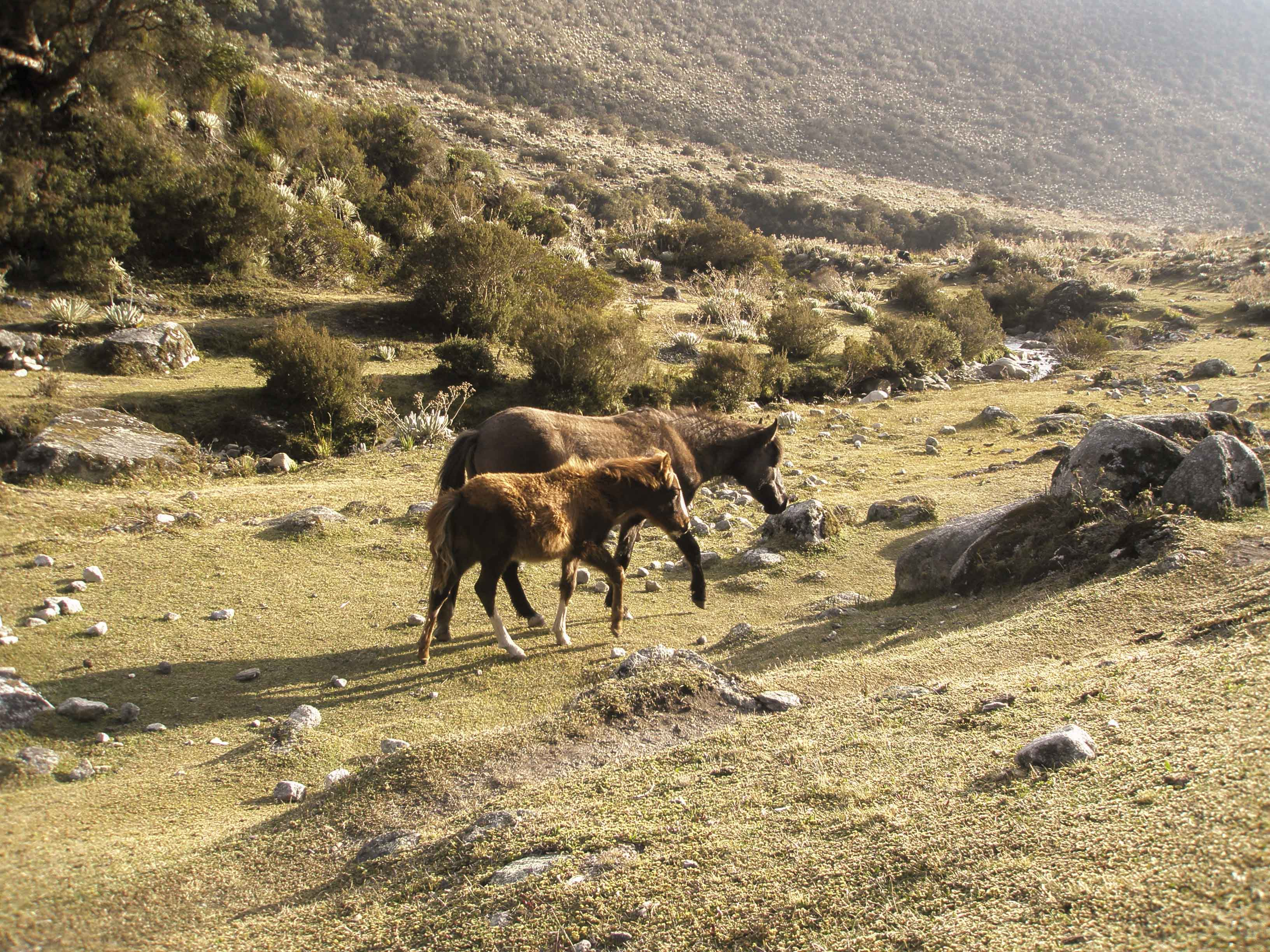
Horses in the Sierra La Culata National Park

The mountain forest extends up to about 3,000 metres (9,800 ft) in altitude, where the páramos begin, Above 4,000 metres (13,000 ft) the páramos are replaced by a periglacial zone with very little vegetation, mostly lichens, mosses and some dwarf plants. No flora or fauna are found above around 4,850 metres (15,910 ft). The ecoregion mostly consists of dry páramo habitat, with high-altitude tussock grass, stands of dwarf bamboo and open meadows There are also some marshes and bogs, although less than in the wet páramo.

=== Fauna ===
Redonda chiquinquirana, a butterfly whose females have limited ability to fly, is endemic to the ecoregion. A study of Carabid beetles found diverse and numerous specimens, all endemic to the ecoregion although closely related to species in other ranges. Carbonellia ater is found between 2,900 and 4,300 metres (9,500 and 14,100 ft). The most important Carabid tribes in terms of numbers of species and of individuals belong to the genera Dyscolus and Bembidion. Endangered amphibians include the Mucubaji stubfoot toad (Atelopus mucubajiensis) and Tamá harlequin frog (Atelopus tamaense). Endangered mammals include Musso's fish-eating rat (Neusticomys mussoi).

== Status ==
The World Wildlife Fund gives the ecoregion the status "Relatively Stable/Intact". Protected areas include the Guaramacal National Park. The Sierra La Culata National Park and Sierra Nevada National Park protect the Ruta de los Páramos, a tourist route through the central páramos.

== Sources ==
- "Cordillera de Merida páramo", Global Species, Myers Enterprises II
- Luteyn, James L., Páramo ecosystem, Missouri Botanical Garden
- Northern Andean Paramo, WWF Global
- Northern South America: Western Venezuela (NT1005), WWF: World Wildlife Fund
- Perrault, G. G. (17 April 2013), "Ecobiogeography of Carabidae in the Andes of Venezuela", Carabid Beetles: Ecology and Evolution, Springer Science & Business Media, ISBN 978-94-017-0968-2
- "Sobre Mérida", meridapreciosa.com, Cibertronic C.A
- Viloria, A.L.; Pyrcz, T.W.; Ferrer-Paris, J.R.; Beccaloni, G.; Sattler, K.; Lees, D.C. (2003), "A brachypterous butterfly?", Proceedings of the Royal Society of London B, 270 (S1): S21-4, doi:10.1098/rsbl.2003.0015, PMC 1698010, PMID 12952626
- WildFinder, WWF: World Wildlife Fund
- Worboys, Graeme; Francis, Wendy L.; Lockwood, Michael (2010), Connectivity Conservation Management: A Global Guide (with Particular Reference to Mountain Connectivity Conservation), Earthscan, ISBN 978-1-84407-603-1
