= Diaphanos huberi =

Scientific classification
- Kingdom: Animalia
- Phylum: Arthropoda
- Class: Insecta
- Order: Lepidoptera
- Family: Nymphalidae
- Genus: Diaphanos
- Species: D. huberi

Binomial name
- Diaphanos huberi Adams & Bernard, 1981

Species of butterfly

Diaphanos huberi is a butterfly in the family Nymphalidae. It is found in Venezuela.
