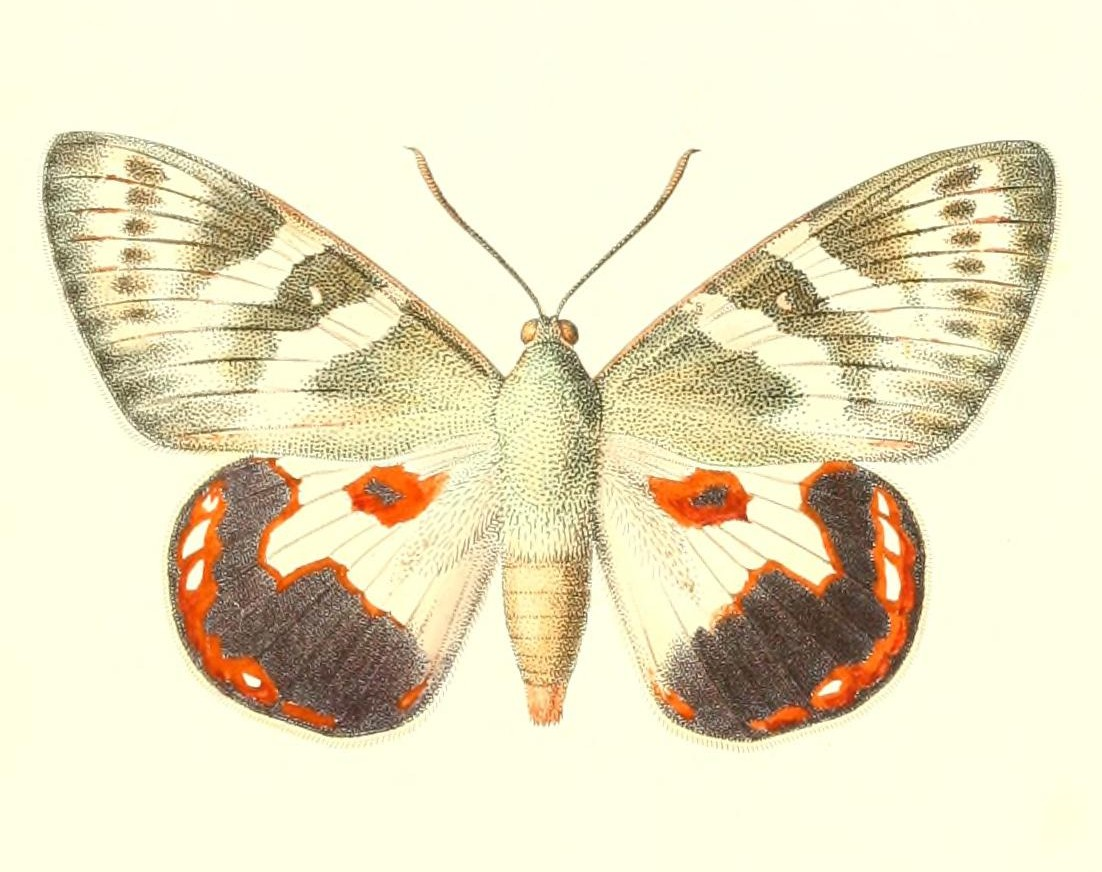

Scientific classification
- Domain: Eukaryota
- Kingdom: Animalia
- Phylum: Arthropoda
- Class: Insecta
- Order: Lepidoptera
- Family: Castniidae
- Genus: Castnia
- Species: C. juturna

Binomial name
- Castnia juturna Hopffer, 1856

Synonyms
- Castnia lorzae Boisduval, [1875]; Castnia var. vesta Krüger, 1928

= Castnia juturna =

Species of moth

Castnia juturna is a species of moth in the family Castniidae. It is known from Brazil and Paraguay.
