= Altopedaliodes =

Scientific classification
- Domain: Eukaryota
- Kingdom: Animalia
- Phylum: Arthropoda
- Class: Insecta
- Order: Lepidoptera
- Family: Nymphalidae
- Subtribe: Pronophilina
- Genus: Altopedaliodes; Forster, 1964

Type species
- Pronophila tena Hewitson, 1869

Genus of butterflies

Altopedialiodes is a genus of satyrid butterflies.

The type species, by original designation, is Pronophila tena Hewitson, 1869.

There are ten recognised species in the Neotropics, including one undescribed species.

== Species ==
- Altopedaliodes cocytia (C. & R. Felder, [1867])
- Altopedaliodes kruegeri Pyrcz, 1999
- Altopedaliodes kurti Pyrcz & Viloria, 1999
- Altopedaliodes nebris (Thieme, 1905)
- Altopedaliodes pasicles (Hewitson, 1872)
- Altopedaliodes perita (Hewitson, 1868)
- Altopedaliodes reissi (Weymer, 1890)
- Altopedaliodes tena (Hewitson, 1869)
- Altopedaliodes zsolti Pyrcz & Viloria, 1999
