= Diaphanos =

Scientific classification
- Kingdom: Animalia
- Phylum: Arthropoda
- Clade: Pancrustacea
- Class: Insecta
- Order: Lepidoptera
- Family: Nymphalidae
- Subfamily: Satyrinae
- Genus: Diaphanos; Adams & Bernard, 1981

Type species
- Diaphanos huberi Adams & Bernard, 1981

Species
- See text

Genus of butterflies

Diaphanos is a genus of butterflies in the family Nymphalidae. There are three recognised species in the Neotropics, and one undescribed subspecies of D. huberi.

== Species ==
- Diaphanos curvignathos Viloria, 1994
- Diaphanos fuscus Viloria, 1994
- Diaphanos huberi Adams & Bernard, 1981

== Taxonomy ==
The type species by original designation is Diaphanos huberi Adams & Bernard, 1981 from the Cordillera de Merida in Venezuela. It was originally considered to be a monotypic genus, but two additional species were described from separate mountaintops in the Venezuelan Andes.
