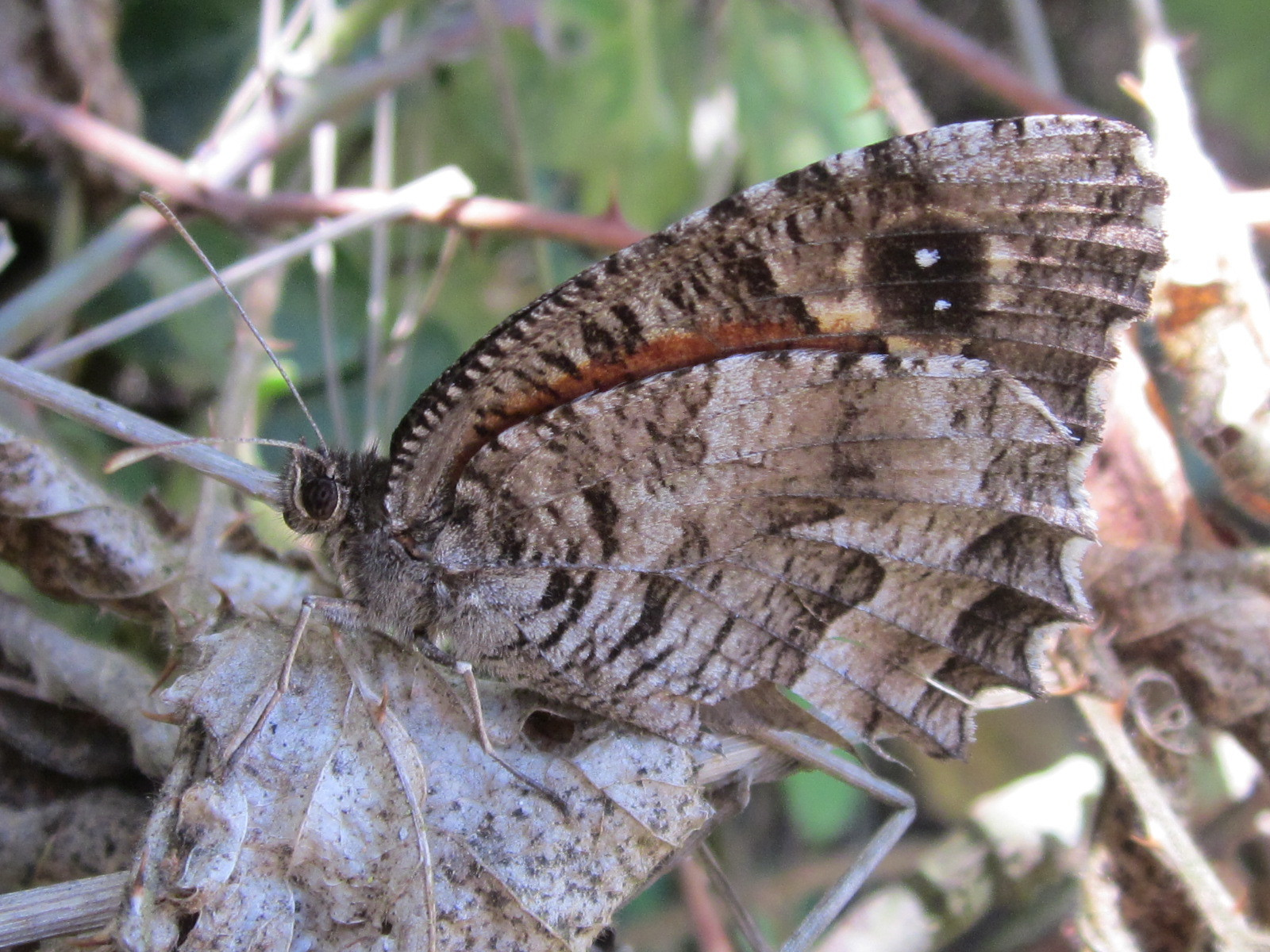
- Elina montrolii

Scientific classification
- Kingdom: Animalia
- Phylum: Arthropoda
- Class: Insecta
- Order: Lepidoptera
- Family: Nymphalidae
- Subfamily: Satyrinae
- Tribe: Satyrini
- Subtribe: Pronophilina
- Genus: Elina; Blanchard, 1852

Type species
- Elina vanessoides

= Elina (butterfly) =

Genus of butterflies

Elina is a genus of butterflies in the family Nymphalidae erected by Émile Blanchard in 1852. It is found in Chile.

== Species ==
- Elina montrolii (Feisthamel, 1839)
- Elina vanessoides Blanchard, 1852
