= Dyscolus =

Scientific classification
- Kingdom: Animalia
- Phylum: Arthropoda
- Class: Insecta
- Order: Coleoptera
- Suborder: Adephaga
- Family: Carabidae
- Subfamily: Platyninae
- Tribe: Platynini
- Subtribe: Platynina
- Genus: Dyscolus; Dejean, 1831

Subgenera
- Andinocolpodes Perrault, 1991; Dyscolidion Moret, 1990; Dyscolus Dejean, 1831; Glyptolenopsis Perrault, 1991; Scaphiodactylus Chaudoir, 1838; Speleodesmoides Mateu, 1978; Stenocnemion Moret, 1989; Tepuydites Monguzzi & Trezzi, 1993

Diversity
- at least 470 species

Genus of beetles

Dyscolus is a very large genus of beetles in the family Carabidae, containing the following species:

- Dyscolus acuminatus Chevrolat, 1835
- Dyscolus acutipennis Chaudoir, 1850
- Dyscolus acutulus (Bates, 1891)
- Dyscolus acutus (Putzeys, 1878)
- Dyscolus aemulus Moret, 1996
- Dyscolus aeneipennis (Dejean, 1831)
- Dyscolus aequatorius (Chaudoir, 1879)
- Dyscolus agilis (Chaudoir, 1878)
- Dyscolus agonellus (Darlington, 1936)
- Dyscolus agonoides (Chaudoir, 1878)
- Dyscolus ahenonotus (Putzeys, 1878)
- Dyscolus albarragas (Perrault, 1988)
- Dyscolus albemarli (Van Dyke, 1953)
- Dyscolus algidus Moret, 2005
- Dyscolus alpaeoides (Chaudoir, 1878)
- Dyscolus alpinus (Chaudoir, 1878)
- Dyscolus altarensis (Bates, 1891)
- Dyscolus alternans (Chaudoir, 1879)
- Dyscolus ambagiosus (Moret, 1990)
- Dyscolus amethystinus Moret & Casale, 1998
- Dyscolus ampliatus (Bates, 1882)
- Dyscolus amplicollis (Chaudoir, 1878)
- Dyscolus angulosus (Chaudoir, 1878)
- Dyscolus angustulus (Liebherr, 1992)
- Dyscolus anichtchenkoi Moret, 2019
- Dyscolus anthracinus (Putzeys, 1878)
- Dyscolus antoninus Moret, 1992
- Dyscolus aphaedrus (Chaudoir, 1859)
- Dyscolus aquator Moret, 2020
- Dyscolus araneus Moret, 2005
- Dyscolus arauzae Moret, 2020
- Dyscolus arborarius Moret, 2020
- Dyscolus arcanus Moret, 2005
- Dyscolus arenasi Moret, 2019
- Dyscolus arvalis Moret, 2005
- Dyscolus asphaltinus (Chaudoir, 1878)
- Dyscolus aterrimus Motschulsky, 1865
- Dyscolus atkinsi Moret, 2001
- Dyscolus atratus (Chaudoir, 1859)
- Dyscolus atroaeneus (Putzeys, 1878)
- Dyscolus aurotinctus (Bates, 1878)
- Dyscolus austerus Moret, 2005
- Dyscolus auyanensis (Monguzzi & Trezzi, 1993)
- Dyscolus bacatellus (Liebherr, 1992)
- Dyscolus baorucensis (Liebherr, 1992)
- Dyscolus barbarellus (Liebherr, 1992)
- Dyscolus barragani Moret, 2020
- Dyscolus batallon Perrault, 1993
- Dyscolus batesi Moret, 2005
- Dyscolus beryllinus (Putzeys, 1878)
- Dyscolus bicolor (Chaudoir, 1879)
- Dyscolus biovatus (Chaudoir, 1878)
- Dyscolus bispinis (Bates, 1882)
- Dyscolus bispinosus (Chaudoir, 1878)
- Dyscolus bliteus Moret, 2005
- Dyscolus bogotensis Perrault, 1992
- Dyscolus bolivianoides Perrault, 1993
- Dyscolus bolivianus Perrault, 1993
- Dyscolus bordoni Moret, 1993
- Dyscolus bousqueti Moret & Casale, 1998
- Dyscolus brachyderus (Chaudoir, 1878)
- Dyscolus brachypterus (Chaudoir, 1859)
- Dyscolus bracteatus (Moret, 1990)
- Dyscolus breviculus Moret, 2001
- Dyscolus brevipennis (Motschulsky, 1865)
- Dyscolus brevis (Putzeys, 1878)
- Dyscolus brocchus Moret, 1996
- Dyscolus brullei (Chaudoir, 1837)
- Dyscolus brunnellus (Liebherr, 1992)
- Dyscolus bucculentus Moret, 1991
- Dyscolus buckleyi (Chaudoir, 1879)
- Dyscolus cachetes Moret, 2001
- Dyscolus caeruleomarginatus Mannerheim, 1837
- Dyscolus caeruleus (Chaudoir, 1859)
- Dyscolus caerulipennis (Liebherr, 1992)
- Dyscolus callanga Perrault, 1992
- Dyscolus camur Moret, 1990
- Dyscolus capito (Bates, 1891)
- Dyscolus capsarius Moret, 2005
- Dyscolus capticius (Moret, 1990)
- Dyscolus carbonarius (Putzeys, 1878)
- Dyscolus carbonescens Moret, 2005
- Dyscolus casalei Moret, 1991
- Dyscolus castanipes (Bates, 1882)
- Dyscolus caucaensis Perrault, 1992
- Dyscolus caulatus Moret, 1993
- Dyscolus cazieri (Liebherr & Will, 1996)
- Dyscolus cephalotes (Chaudoir, 1878)
- Dyscolus chalconotus (Chaudoir, 1878)
- Dyscolus championi (Bates, 1882)
- Dyscolus chathami (Van Dyke, 1953)
- Dyscolus chaudoiri (Coquerel, 1866)
- Dyscolus chiriquinus (Bates, 1882)
- Dyscolus chontalensis (Bates, 1878)
- Dyscolus chrysopterus (Bates, 1878)
- Dyscolus ciliatus (Chaudoir, 1878)
- Dyscolus clarus (Chaudoir, 1878)
- Dyscolus cleanthes (Bates, 1884)
- Dyscolus cochabamba Perrault, 1993
- Dyscolus coloradito Perrault, 1990
- Dyscolus columbinus (Chaudoir, 1878)
- Dyscolus concisus (Bates, 1878)
- Dyscolus conicus (Chaudoir, 1879)
- Dyscolus consanguineus (Chaudoir, 1878)
- Dyscolus contumaza Perrault, 1993
- Dyscolus convergens (Bates, 1882)
- Dyscolus coptoderoides (Darlington, 1937)
- Dyscolus cordatus (Chaudoir, 1859)
- Dyscolus cordicollis (Motschulsky, 1865)
- Dyscolus cordillerensis Perrault, 1990
- Dyscolus corvinus (Dejean, 1831)
- Dyscolus costaricensis Moret & Casale, 1998
- Dyscolus cozier (Liebherr & Will, 1996)
- Dyscolus crabbei Moret, 1993
- Dyscolus crassus Moret, 1991
- Dyscolus crespoae Moret, 2020
- Dyscolus cristensis Perrault, 1990
- Dyscolus cruzensis Perrault, 1990
- Dyscolus crypticulus (Liebherr, 1992)
- Dyscolus culatensis Perrault, 1992
- Dyscolus cuprascens (Motschulsky, 1865)
- Dyscolus cupripennis Laporte, 1835
- Dyscolus cursor Moret, 2005
- Dyscolus cyanellus Chaudoir, 1850
- Dyscolus cyaneocupreus (Putzeys, 1878)
- Dyscolus cyanicollis Brullé, 1835
- Dyscolus cyanides (Bates, 1882)
- Dyscolus cyanipennis Erichson, 1847
- Dyscolus cyanonotus Chaudoir, 1850
- Dyscolus cyanostolus (Bates, 1878)
- Dyscolus cycloderus (Chaudoir, 1859)
- Dyscolus cyphopterus Perrault, 1993
- Dyscolus cyrtonotoides Perrault, 1990
- Dyscolus danglesi Moret, 2020
- Dyscolus darwini (Van Dyke, 1953)
- Dyscolus davidsoni Moret, 1994
- Dyscolus decorellus (Liebherr, 1992)
- Dyscolus defrictus Moret, 1993
- Dyscolus degallieri (Perrault, 1991)
- Dyscolus dejeanii (Chaudoir, 1859)
- Dyscolus delenitor (Moret, 1990)
- Dyscolus delicatulus (Chaudoir, 1878)
- Dyscolus denigratus (Bates, 1891)
- Dyscolus despiciendus (Chaudoir, 1878)
- Dyscolus desultor Moret, 2005
- Dyscolus deuvei Moret, 2005
- Dyscolus deyrollei (Chaudoir, 1878)
- Dyscolus dilutus (Chaudoir, 1859)
- Dyscolus diopsis (Bates, 1891)
- Dyscolus dominicensis (Bates, 1882)
- Dyscolus donosoi Moret, 2020
- Dyscolus donrwi Perrault, 1993
- Dyscolus drusillus (Bates, 1891)
- Dyscolus duplex (Bates, 1878)
- Dyscolus duportei (Liebherr & Ivie, 2021)
- Dyscolus dupuisi Moret, 2005
- Dyscolus durangensis (Bates, 1882)
- Dyscolus dyschirioides (Bates, 1882)
- Dyscolus dyschromus (Chaudoir, 1878)
- Dyscolus ebeninus (Chaudoir, 1878)
- Dyscolus ecuadoriensis Perrault, 1992
- Dyscolus eleonorae Moret, 2020
- Dyscolus ellipticus (Chaudoir, 1878)
- Dyscolus elliptolellus (Liebherr, 1992)
- Dyscolus elongatus (Chaudoir, 1879)
- Dyscolus epilissus (Bates, 1884)
- Dyscolus erythrocerus (Chaudoir, 1859)
- Dyscolus etontii Moret, 1996
- Dyscolus eudemus (Bates, 1884)
- Dyscolus evanescens (Bates, 1882)
- Dyscolus expansus Perrault, 1993
- Dyscolus exsul Moret, 2005
- Dyscolus fallax (Moret, 1990)
- Dyscolus falli (Darlington, 1936)
- Dyscolus famelicus Moret, 2020
- Dyscolus fartilis Moret, 2005
- Dyscolus femoralis (Chaudoir, 1879)
- Dyscolus feronioides (Reiche, 1843)
- Dyscolus festinus Moret, 2005
- Dyscolus flavomarginatus (Liebherr, 1992)
- Dyscolus fragilis (Chaudoir, 1878)
- Dyscolus fratellus (Chaudoir, 1879)
- Dyscolus frigidus (Chaudoir, 1878)
- Dyscolus fronto Moret, 1998
- Dyscolus fucatus Moret, 2005
- Dyscolus funereus (Moret, 1991)
- Dyscolus furcillatus (Moret, 1991)
- Dyscolus furvus Moret, 2005
- Dyscolus fusipalpis (Bates, 1891)
- Dyscolus gaujoni (Perrault, 1989)
- Dyscolus gemellus (Moret, 1990)
- Dyscolus giachinoi (Moret, 1996)
- Dyscolus giselae Moret, 2020
- Dyscolus glaucipennis (Liebherr, 1987)
- Dyscolus globoculus Moret, 2020
- Dyscolus gobbii Moret, 2020
- Dyscolus gracilis (Chaudoir, 1859)
- Dyscolus grandicollis (Reiche, 1843)
- Dyscolus gratus (Bates, 1878)
- Dyscolus guatemalensis (Chaudoir, 1878)
- Dyscolus hapax Moret, 2005
- Dyscolus haptoderoides (Bates, 1891)
- Dyscolus harpaloides (Bates, 1891)
- Dyscolus hebeculus (Bates, 1891)
- Dyscolus hemicyclicus (Bates, 1882)
- Dyscolus hexacoelus (Chaudoir, 1879)
- Dyscolus hirsutus Moret, 2005
- Dyscolus horni (Bates, 1882)
- Dyscolus ignicauda (Bates, 1882)
- Dyscolus imbaburae Moret, 2005
- Dyscolus imitativus (Liebherr, 1992)
- Dyscolus imitator (Moret, 1990)
- Dyscolus immodicus Moret, 2005
- Dyscolus impiger Moret, 2005
- Dyscolus incomis (Bates, 1882)
- Dyscolus incommunis Moret, 2020
- Dyscolus inconspicuus (Chaudoir, 1878)
- Dyscolus incultus (Bates, 1882)
- Dyscolus intergeneus (Bates, 1878)
- Dyscolus interruptus (Putzeys, 1878)
- Dyscolus interstitialis Perrault, 1993
- Dyscolus involucer Moret, 1994
- Dyscolus iricolor (Bates, 1882)
- Dyscolus irriguus Moret, 2005
- Dyscolus isabellae Camero, 2010
- Dyscolus jelskii Perrault, 1990
- Dyscolus jimenezi Moret & Casale, 1998
- Dyscolus joseensis Perrault, 1990
- Dyscolus kennedyensis Camero, 2010
- Dyscolus lacertosus Moret, 1998
- Dyscolus lactipes (Bates, 1878)
- Dyscolus laetificus (Darlington, 1936)
- Dyscolus laetiusculus (Chaudoir, 1878)
- Dyscolus laevilateris (Bates, 1891)
- Dyscolus laevipennis (Chaudoir, 1879)
- Dyscolus laevipennoides Perrault, 1992
- Dyscolus lagunensis Perrault, 1993
- Dyscolus lamottei Perrault, 1990
- Dyscolus lamotteioides Perrault, 1990
- Dyscolus lamprotus (Bates, 1882)
- Dyscolus landolti (Putzeys, 1878)
- Dyscolus laticollis (Reiche, 1843)
- Dyscolus latidens (Chaudoir, 1859)
- Dyscolus leleupi Moret, 1993
- Dyscolus leptomorphus (Chaudoir, 1879)
- Dyscolus leucoscelis (Bates, 1882)
- Dyscolus lherminieri (Chaudoir, 1842)
- Dyscolus lignicola Moret, 1994
- Dyscolus limbicollis (Chaudoir, 1879)
- Dyscolus lionotus (Chaudoir, 1879)
- Dyscolus lissomus (Bates, 1882)
- Dyscolus lojaensis Perrault, 1993
- Dyscolus longipennis (Reiche, 1843)
- Dyscolus longipes (Chaudoir, 1878)
- Dyscolus lubricus Moret, 2001
- Dyscolus luciae (Liebherr, 1987)
- Dyscolus lucidus (Chaudoir, 1879)
- Dyscolus lucifugus Moret, 1990
- Dyscolus lucilius (Bates, 1884)
- Dyscolus lugens (Dejean, 1831)
- Dyscolus lutarius Moret, 2005
- Dyscolus lyrophorus (Chaudoir, 1878)
- Dyscolus macerrimus Moret, 2005
- Dyscolus machetellus (Liebherr, 1992)
- Dyscolus macroderus (Chaudoir, 1879)
- Dyscolus macrous (Chaudoir, 1878)
- Dyscolus maleodoratus Moret, 2005
- Dyscolus margaritulus (Liebherr, 1992)
- Dyscolus marginicollis (Chaudoir, 1859)
- Dyscolus marginissimus (Liebherr, 1992)
- Dyscolus marini Moret, 2020
- Dyscolus martinezae Moret, 2019
- Dyscolus mateui (Moret, 1991)
- Dyscolus matucana Perrault, 1993
- Dyscolus megacephalus (Bates, 1891)
- Dyscolus megalops (Bates, 1882)
- Dyscolus melanius (Bates, 1882)
- Dyscolus melanocnemis (Chaudoir, 1878)
- Dyscolus melas (Putzeys, 1878)
- Dyscolus memnonius (Dejean, 1828)
- Dyscolus meridanus (Chaudoir, 1859)
- Dyscolus metallicus (Chaudoir, 1859)
- Dyscolus metallosomus (Liebherr, 1987)
- Dyscolus micans (Putzeys, 1878)
- Dyscolus mimulus (Liebherr, 1992)
- Dyscolus minimus (Bates, 1884)
- Dyscolus minusculus (Liebherr, 1992)
- Dyscolus mirandus Perrault, 1993
- Dyscolus moestus (Dejean, 1831)
- Dyscolus monachus (Dejean, 1831)
- Dyscolus mongusi Moret, 2005
- Dyscolus monterredonda Perrault, 1992
- Dyscolus montivagus Moret, 1998
- Dyscolus montufari Moret, 2005
- Dyscolus morenensis Perrault, 1992
- Dyscolus moreti Perrault, 1993
- Dyscolus moretianus Perrault, 1993
- Dyscolus moritzi Perrault, 1992
- Dyscolus morosus (Chaudoir, 1878)
- Dyscolus mucronatus (Moret, 1991)
- Dyscolus mucubajii Perrault, 1990
- Dyscolus mucunuque Perrault, 1993
- Dyscolus mucuy Perrault, 1992
- Dyscolus muzo Perrault, 1993
- Dyscolus nebrianus (Fairmaire, 1878)
- Dyscolus nevadicus Perrault, 1990
- Dyscolus nevermanni (Liebherr, 1992)
- Dyscolus niger (Chaudoir, 1859)
- Dyscolus nitidulus (Liebherr, 1992)
- Dyscolus nitidus Chaudoir, 1837
- Dyscolus nocticolor Moret, 2005
- Dyscolus noctuabundus Moret, 2005
- Dyscolus nubilus Moret, 2001
- Dyscolus nugax (Bates, 1878)
- Dyscolus nyctimus (Bates, 1884)
- Dyscolus obesulus (Chaudoir, 1878)
- Dyscolus obscurus (Chaudoir, 1859)
- Dyscolus obuncus Moret, 1993
- Dyscolus olivaceus (Chaudoir, 1878)
- Dyscolus omaseoides (Bates, 1891)
- Dyscolus omissus Moret, 1994
- Dyscolus onorei Moret, 1993
- Dyscolus oopteroides (Chaudoir, 1878)
- Dyscolus oopterus (Chaudoir, 1859)
- Dyscolus opalescens (Bates, 1882)
- Dyscolus orbicollis (Chaudoir, 1859)
- Dyscolus oreas (Bates, 1891)
- Dyscolus orthomus (Chaudoir, 1878)
- Dyscolus otavaloensis Perrault, 1993
- Dyscolus ovatulus (Bates, 1884)
- Dyscolus ovatus (Putzeys, 1878)
- Dyscolus pallidipes Chaudoir, 1850
- Dyscolus paramemnonius (Liebherr, 1987)
- Dyscolus parviceps (Bates, 1878)
- Dyscolus patocochae Moret, 2005
- Dyscolus patroboides (Bates, 1891)
- Dyscolus pavens (Darlington, 1936)
- Dyscolus pectoralis (Chaudoir, 1879)
- Dyscolus phaeocnemis (Chaudoir, 1879)
- Dyscolus phaeolomus (Chaudoir, 1879)
- Dyscolus physopterus (Chaudoir, 1878)
- Dyscolus piceolus (Chaudoir, 1878)
- Dyscolus picicornis (Chaudoir, 1879)
- Dyscolus piscator Moret, 2020
- Dyscolus placitus Moret, 2020
- Dyscolus platyderoides Perrault, 1990
- Dyscolus platynellus (Liebherr, 1992)
- Dyscolus platynoides (Chaudoir, 1878)
- Dyscolus platysmoides (Bates, 1891)
- Dyscolus plebeius (Chaudoir, 1879)
- Dyscolus politus (Putzeys, 1878)
- Dyscolus pollens Moret, 1991
- Dyscolus polylepidium Perrault, 1993
- Dyscolus porrectus (Chaudoir, 1878)
- Dyscolus portentosus Moret, 2005
- Dyscolus princeps (Bates, 1878)
- Dyscolus pristonychoides (Chaudoir, 1878)
- Dyscolus procephalus (Bates, 1878)
- Dyscolus prolixus (Bates, 1878)
- Dyscolus prostomis (Bates, 1878)
- Dyscolus proteinus (Bates, 1882)
- Dyscolus protensus (Putzeys, 1878)
- Dyscolus pseudellipticus (Liebherr, 1987)
- Dyscolus pseudoconicus Perrault, 1992
- Dyscolus pullatus Moret, 2005
- Dyscolus punctatostriatus (Putzeys, 1878)
- Dyscolus punctinotus (Liebherr, 1987)
- Dyscolus punoensis (Perrault, 1990)
- Dyscolus purpuratus Reiche, 1843
- Dyscolus purpurellus (Liebherr, 1992)
- Dyscolus purulensis (Bates, 1882)
- Dyscolus pyrophilus Moret, 2005
- Dyscolus quadricollis (Chaudoir, 1859)
- Dyscolus quadridentatus (Bates, 1882)
- Dyscolus quadrilaterus (Bates, 1882)
- Dyscolus quitensis Perrault, 1993
- Dyscolus racquelae (Liebherr & Ivie, 2021)
- Dyscolus raveloi (Mateu, 1978)
- Dyscolus ravidus Moret, 2020
- Dyscolus rectilineus (Bates, 1891)
- Dyscolus redondensis Perrault, 1991
- Dyscolus reflexicollis (Chaudoir, 1859)
- Dyscolus reflexus (Chaudoir, 1859)
- Dyscolus reichei (Perrault, 1989)
- Dyscolus ripicola Moret, 1990
- Dyscolus riveti Moret, 2001
- Dyscolus rivinus Moret, 2020
- Dyscolus robiginosus Moret, 2005
- Dyscolus robustulus (Liebherr, 1992)
- Dyscolus rotundatulus (Liebherr, 1992)
- Dyscolus rotundiceps (Bates, 1891)
- Dyscolus rubellus Moret, 1991
- Dyscolus rubidus (Chaudoir, 1878)
- Dyscolus ruficornis (Chaudoir, 1859)
- Dyscolus rufiventris (Van Dyke, 1926)
- Dyscolus rufulus (Bates, 1884)
- Dyscolus rugitarsis Moret, 2020
- Dyscolus rugulellus (Liebherr, 1992)
- Dyscolus ruizi Moret, 2020
- Dyscolus ruminahui Moret, 2005
- Dyscolus russeus Moret, 1994
- Dyscolus rutilans (Motschulsky, 1865)
- Dyscolus salazarae Moret, 2020
- Dyscolus saxatilis Moret, 1993
- Dyscolus scabricollis (Bates, 1882)
- Dyscolus schunkei Perrault, 1993
- Dyscolus sciakyi Moret, 1996
- Dyscolus segnipes Moret, 1990
- Dyscolus segregatus (Bates, 1891)
- Dyscolus sellensis (Darlington, 1937)
- Dyscolus sellularius Moret, 2005
- Dyscolus semiopacus (Chaudoir, 1878)
- Dyscolus semirufus (Motschulsky, 1865)
- Dyscolus seriepunctatus (Chaudoir, 1859)
- Dyscolus severus (Chaudoir, 1878)
- Dyscolus sexfoveolatus (Chaudoir, 1878)
- Dyscolus silvestris Moret, 2020
- Dyscolus simoni Perrault, 1992
- Dyscolus sinuosus (Chaudoir, 1878)
- Dyscolus smithersi Moret, 2001
- Dyscolus sphodroides (Chaudoir, 1859)
- Dyscolus spinifer (Bates, 1882)
- Dyscolus spinipennis (Reiche, 1843)
- Dyscolus steinheili Perrault, 1993
- Dyscolus stenophthalmus (Liebherr, 1992)
- Dyscolus steropoides (Bates, 1891)
- Dyscolus striatopunctatus (Chaudoir, 1859)
- Dyscolus striatulus (Chaudoir, 1878)
- Dyscolus subangulatus (Chaudoir, 1878)
- Dyscolus subauratus (Bates, 1882)
- Dyscolus subcyaneus (Chaudoir, 1879)
- Dyscolus subiridescens (Chaudoir, 1878)
- Dyscolus sublaevipennis Perrault, 1992
- Dyscolus subreflexus (Chaudoir, 1878)
- Dyscolus subviolaceus (Chaudoir, 1842)
- Dyscolus sulcatus (Guérin-Méneville, 1844)
- Dyscolus sulcipedis Moret, 2020
- Dyscolus superbus (Bates, 1878)
- Dyscolus tachiranus Perrault, 1993
- Dyscolus tapiarius Moret, 2005
- Dyscolus tenuicornis (Chaudoir, 1859)
- Dyscolus teter (Chaudoir, 1878)
- Dyscolus thecarum Moret, 1998
- Dyscolus thiemei Perrault, 1990
- Dyscolus tiguensis Moret, 2005
- Dyscolus tinctipennis (Bates, 1891)
- Dyscolus tovarensis Perrault, 1993
- Dyscolus transfuga (Chaudoir, 1878)
- Dyscolus transversicollis (Chaudoir, 1859)
- Dyscolus trapezicollis (Putzeys, 1878)
- Dyscolus trossulus Moret, 2005
- Dyscolus troyaensis Perrault, 1993
- Dyscolus tuberosus Moret, 2005
- Dyscolus umerangulatus Perrault, 1993
- Dyscolus unilobatus (Bates, 1882)
- Dyscolus unipunctatus Perrault, 1990
- Dyscolus valens (Bates, 1891)
- Dyscolus validus (Chaudoir, 1859)
- Dyscolus variabilis Chaudoir, 1837
- Dyscolus variolosus Moret, 2019
- Dyscolus vegaensis Perrault, 1992
- Dyscolus velox Moret, 2005
- Dyscolus venezolanus Perrault, 1993
- Dyscolus verecundior Moret, 2020
- Dyscolus verecundissimus Moret, 2020
- Dyscolus verecundus Moret, 1998
- Dyscolus villavicencio Perrault, 1992
- Dyscolus violaceipennis (Chaudoir, 1859)
- Dyscolus virescens (Motschulsky, 1865)
- Dyscolus viridans (Bates, 1884)
- Dyscolus viridiauratus (Bates, 1878)
- Dyscolus viridipennis (Motschulsky, 1864)
- Dyscolus whymperi Moret, 1998
- Dyscolus woldai (Liebherr, 1992)
- Dyscolus yanacochae Moret, 2005
- Dyscolus zunilensis (Bates, 1882)
