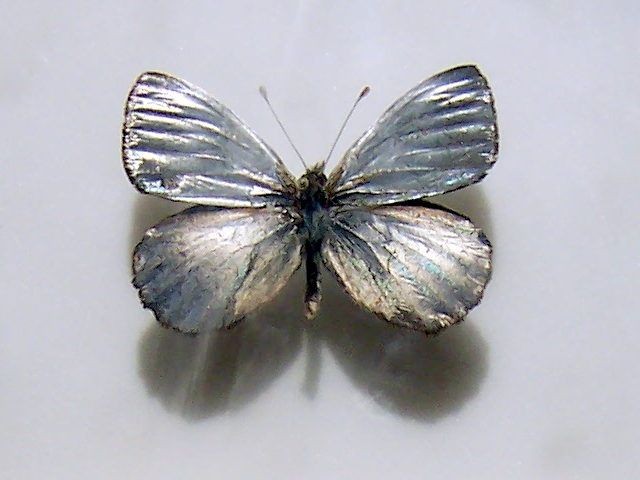

Scientific classification
- Domain: Eukaryota
- Kingdom: Animalia
- Phylum: Arthropoda
- Class: Insecta
- Order: Lepidoptera
- Family: Nymphalidae
- Genus: Argyrophorus
- Species: A. argenteus

Binomial name
- Argyrophorus argenteus Blanchard, 1852

= Argyrophorus argenteus =

Species of butterfly

Argyrophorus argenteus is a butterfly of the family Nymphalidae. It is found on the lower slopes of the Andes in Chile and Argentina.

The wingspan is about 40 mm.

The larvae feed on various grasses, including Stipa species.

== Subspecies ==
- Argyrophorus argenteus argenteus
- Argyrophorus argenteus barrosi
- Argyrophorus argenteus elinoides
