= Paramo aculata =

Scientific classification
- Domain: Eukaryota
- Kingdom: Animalia
- Phylum: Arthropoda
- Class: Insecta
- Order: Lepidoptera
- Family: Nymphalidae
- Subfamily: Satyrinae
- Tribe: Satyrini
- Subtribe: Pronophilina
- Genus: Paramo; Adams & Bernard, 1977
- Species: P. aculata

Binomial name
- Paramo aculata (Krüger, 1924)

Species of butterfly

Paramo aculata is the sole species in the monotypic butterfly genus Paramo from the subfamily Satyrinae in the family Nymphalidae. The genus was erected by Michael Jan Adams and George Igor Bernard in 1977. The species was first described by Edwin Krüger in 1924. It occurs in Colombia.
