= Tamania jacquelinae =

Scientific classification
- Kingdom: Animalia
- Phylum: Arthropoda
- Clade: Pancrustacea
- Class: Insecta
- Order: Lepidoptera
- Family: Nymphalidae
- Subfamily: Satyrinae
- Tribe: Satyrini
- Subtribe: Pronophilina
- Genus: Tamania; Pyrcz, 1995
- Species: T. jacquelinae

Binomial name
- Tamania jacquelinae Pyrcz, 1995

Species of butterfly

Tamania is a genus of butterflies in the family Nymphalidae. It contains only one species, Tamania jacquelinae, which is found in the Neotropics, including Venezuela.
