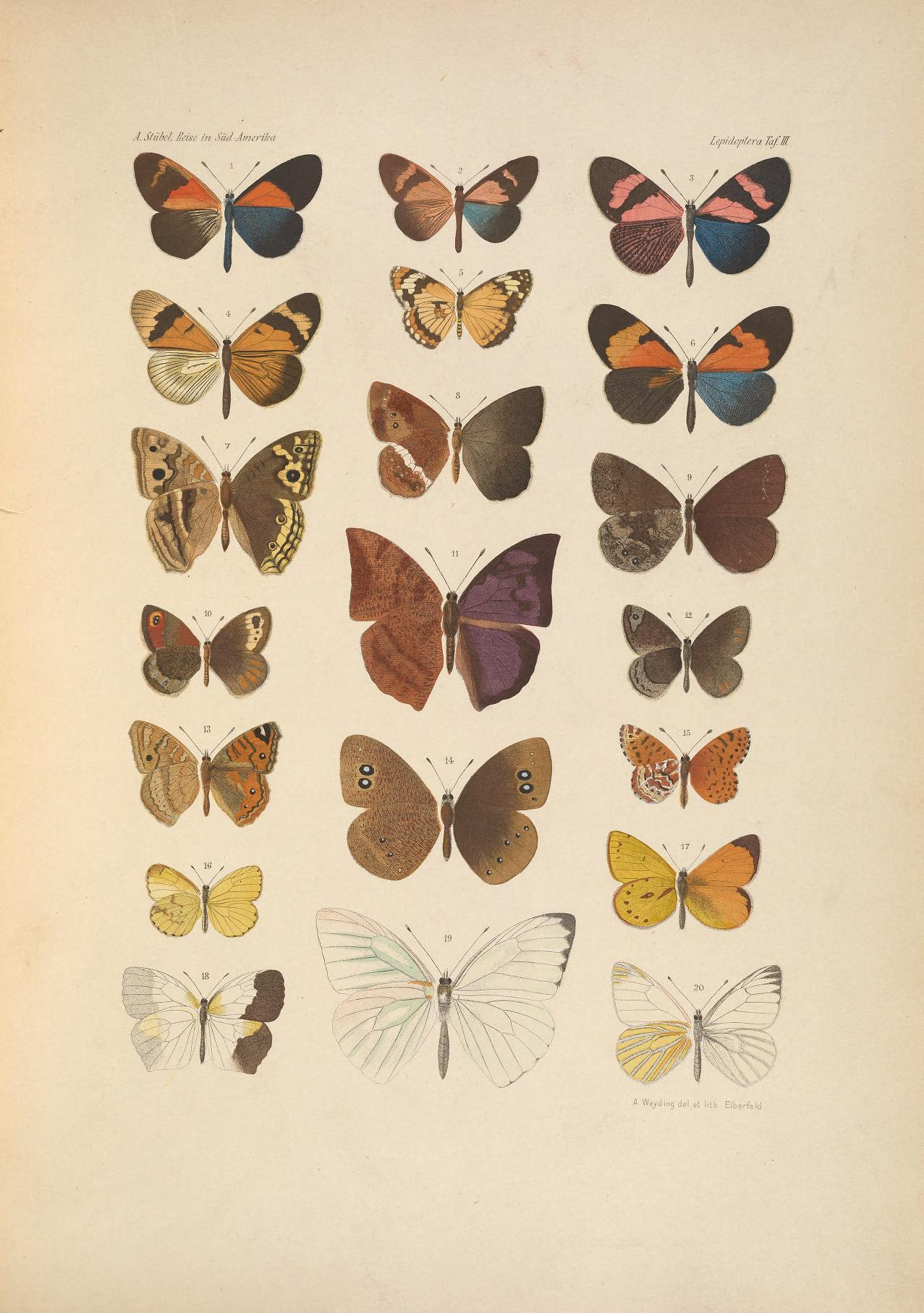
- Neomaniola euripides in Weymer & Maassen's 1890 Lepidoptera gesammelt auf einer Reise durch Colombia, Ecuador, Peru, Brasilien, Argentinien und Bolivien in den Jahren 1868-1877 von Alphons Stübel Reisen Süd-America

Scientific classification
- Kingdom: Animalia
- Phylum: Arthropoda
- Class: Insecta
- Order: Lepidoptera
- Family: Nymphalidae
- Subfamily: Satyrinae
- Genus: Neomaniola; Hayward, 1949
- Species: N. euripides

Binomial name
- Neomaniola euripides (Weymer, 1890)

Synonyms
- Pseudomaniola Weymer, 1890 (preocc. Röber, 1889); Pseudomaniola euripides Weymer, 1890; Pseudomaniola salomonisi Köhler, 1939

= Neomaniola =

Monotypic brush-footed butterfly genus

Neomaniola is a Neotropical butterfly genus in the family Nymphalidae. The genus is monotypic containing the single species Neomaniola euripides, which is found in Bolivia and Argentina.
