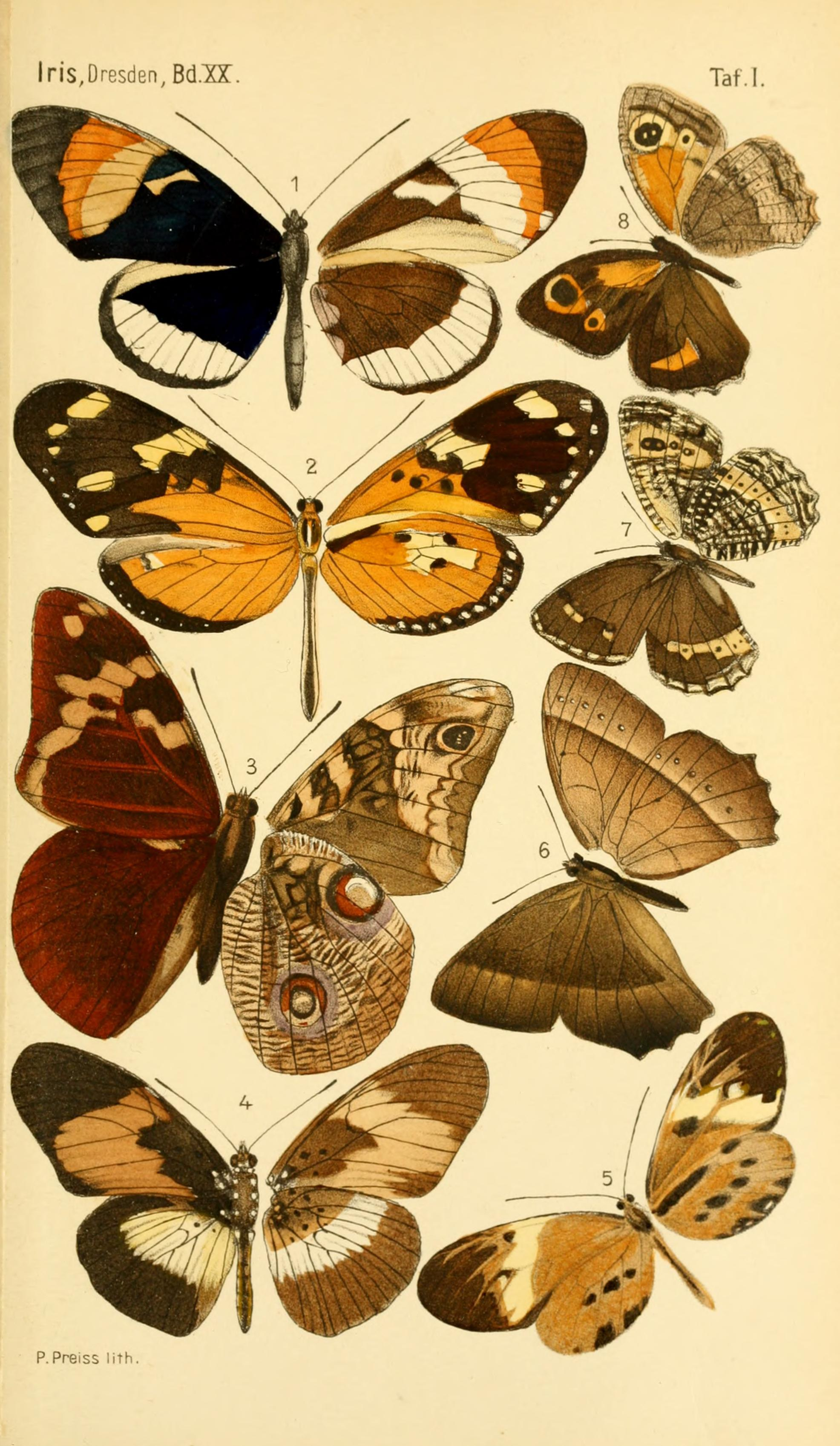
- Pampasatyrus reticulata figure 7

Scientific classification
- Kingdom: Animalia
- Phylum: Arthropoda
- Class: Insecta
- Order: Lepidoptera
- Family: Nymphalidae
- Subfamily: Satyrinae
- Genus: Pampasatyrus; Hayward, 1953

Synonyms
- Pseudocercyonis Miller & Emmel, 1971

= Pampasatyrus =

Genus of brush-footed butterflies

Pampasatyrus is a Neotropical genus of butterflies in the family Nymphalidae.

== Species ==
- Pampasatyrus glaucope (C. & R. Felder, [1867])
- Pampasatyrus gyrtone (Berg, 1877)
- Pampasatyrus imbrialis (Weeks, 1901)
- Pampasatyrus nilesi (Weeks, 1902)
- Pampasatyrus ocelloides (Schaus, 1902)
- Pampasatyrus periphas (Godart, [1824])
- Pampasatyrus quies (Berg, 1877)
- Pampasatyrus reticulata (Weymer, 1907)
- Pampasatyrus yacantoensis (Köhler, 1939)
