= Theodor Otto Thieme =

German entomologist

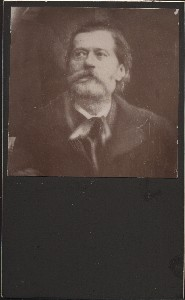
Theodor Otto Thieme

Theodor Alexander Otto Thieme ( 24 January 1857, Oldisleben – 1 July 1907, Berlin?) was a German entomologist.

Thieme was a teacher (oberlehrer). He specialised in the Coleoptera and Satyrinae of the neotropics. His work on Pronophilina is especially important. His collections are variously held by Museum für Naturkunde in Berlin, Zoologische Staatssammlung München and Muséum national d'histoire naturelle.

Thieme first studied theology and classical philology at the universities of Jena and Leipzig. He worked for some years at a German private school in Viborg then in Finland and later in the service of higher education in the city of Berlin. He collected insects in Italy, France and Switzerland, then travelled to South America on a two year expedition.

== Works ==
partial list

- Thieme, O. (1904) Neue Tagesschmetterlinge aus der südamerikanischen Cordillere". Beit. Entomol. Zeitschrift. XLIX.
- Thieme, O. (1905) Monographie der gattung Pedaliodes Butl. (Lepidoptera: Rhopalocera: Satyridae). Berliner Entomologische Zeitschrift, 50 (1/2), 43–141, pls. 1–3.
- Thieme, O. (1907) Monographische Bearbeitung der Gattungen Lasiophila Felder, Daedalma Hew., Catargynnis Röber, Oxeoschistus Butl., Pronophila Westw., Corades Double. Hew. (Lepidoptera Rhopalocera. Satyridae). Mit Bergründung neuer Gattungen und einer Anzah Berl. ent. Z. 51(2), pp. [101-233, illustrated]
