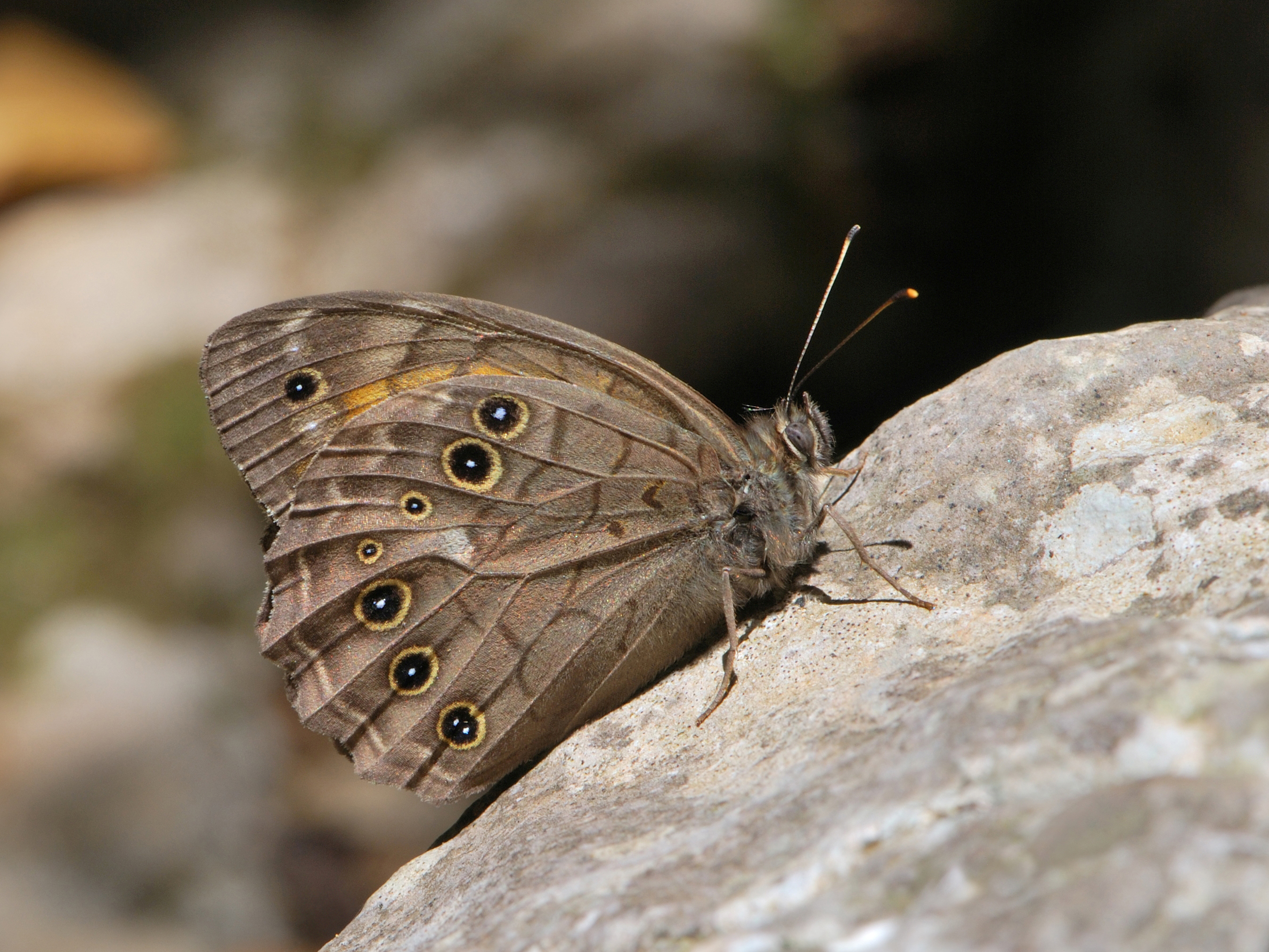
- Adult male, showing ventral surface of wings

Scientific classification
- Kingdom: Animalia
- Phylum: Arthropoda
- Class: Insecta
- Order: Lepidoptera
- Family: Nymphalidae
- Genus: Kirinia
- Species: K. roxelana

Binomial name
- Kirinia roxelana (Cramer, 1777)

Synonyms
- Pararge roxelana (Cramer, 1777); Papilio roxelana Cramer, 1777

= Kirinia roxelana =

Species of butterfly

Kirinia roxelana, the lattice brown, is a butterfly of the family Nymphalidae. It is found in southeastern Europe and the Near East. The butterfly is on wing between May and July. The larvae feed on various grasses.

== Description ==
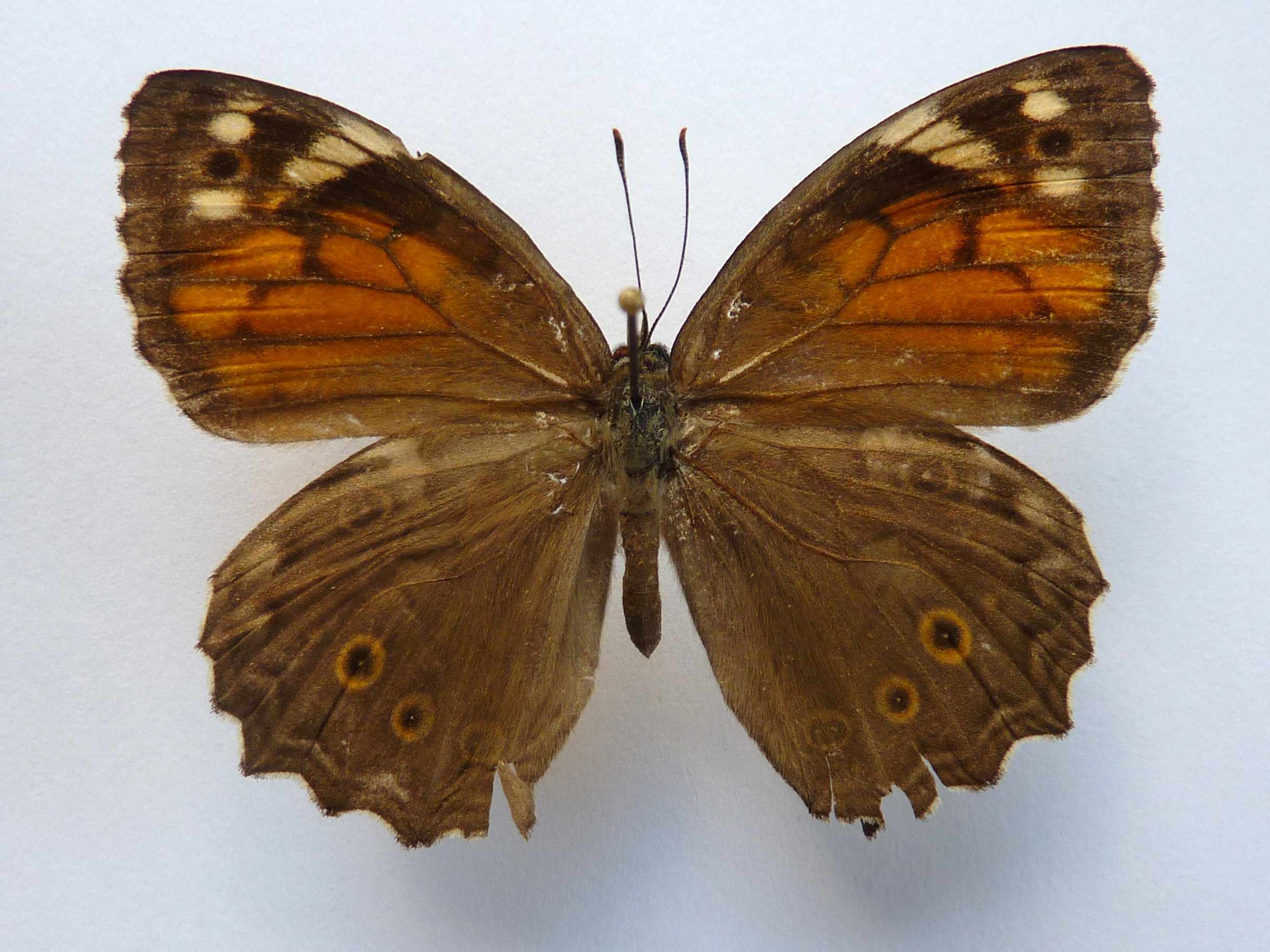
Adult female, showing dorsal surface

The length of the forewings is 29 to 31 mm (1.1 to 1.2 in). Seitz describes it thus- P. roxelana Cr. (45 c). The largest Pararge, with the margin of the hindwing strongly dentate, especially in the female. Male black-brown. Female grey-brown, with the disc of the forewing reddish yellow. Underside of forewing fiery yellowish red with the margins grey-brown; hindwing beneath with dark dentate lines and a curved row of unequal ocelli beyond the centre. From South-East Hungary to the Black Sea, on the Balcan Peninsula, Cyprus, in Asia Minor and Mesopotamia, in the plains as well as the mountains, in June and July, not rare. It can be confused with the lesser lattice brown (Kirinia climene) with which it shares part of its range.

== Distribution and habitat ==
The lattice brown is found in southeastern Europe and the Near East. Its range extends from Bulgaria and southern Croatia through the Balkans to northern Iran, Turkey and Israel, including many of the islands in the Aegean Sea. It is found in a variety of habitats such as warm, dry grassland and scrubland with rocks near woodland, forest verges, vineyards and olive groves with stone walls.

== Ecology ==
There is one generation of this butterfly which is on the wing between April and September, and is most commonly seen from May to July. The eggs are laid on broad-leaved grasses, often at the foot of walls or rocks. The caterpillars are fusiform, green with longitudinal yellowish and pale green stripes. Having overwintered as caterpillars, they pupate in the spring among the vegetation before emerging as adults.
