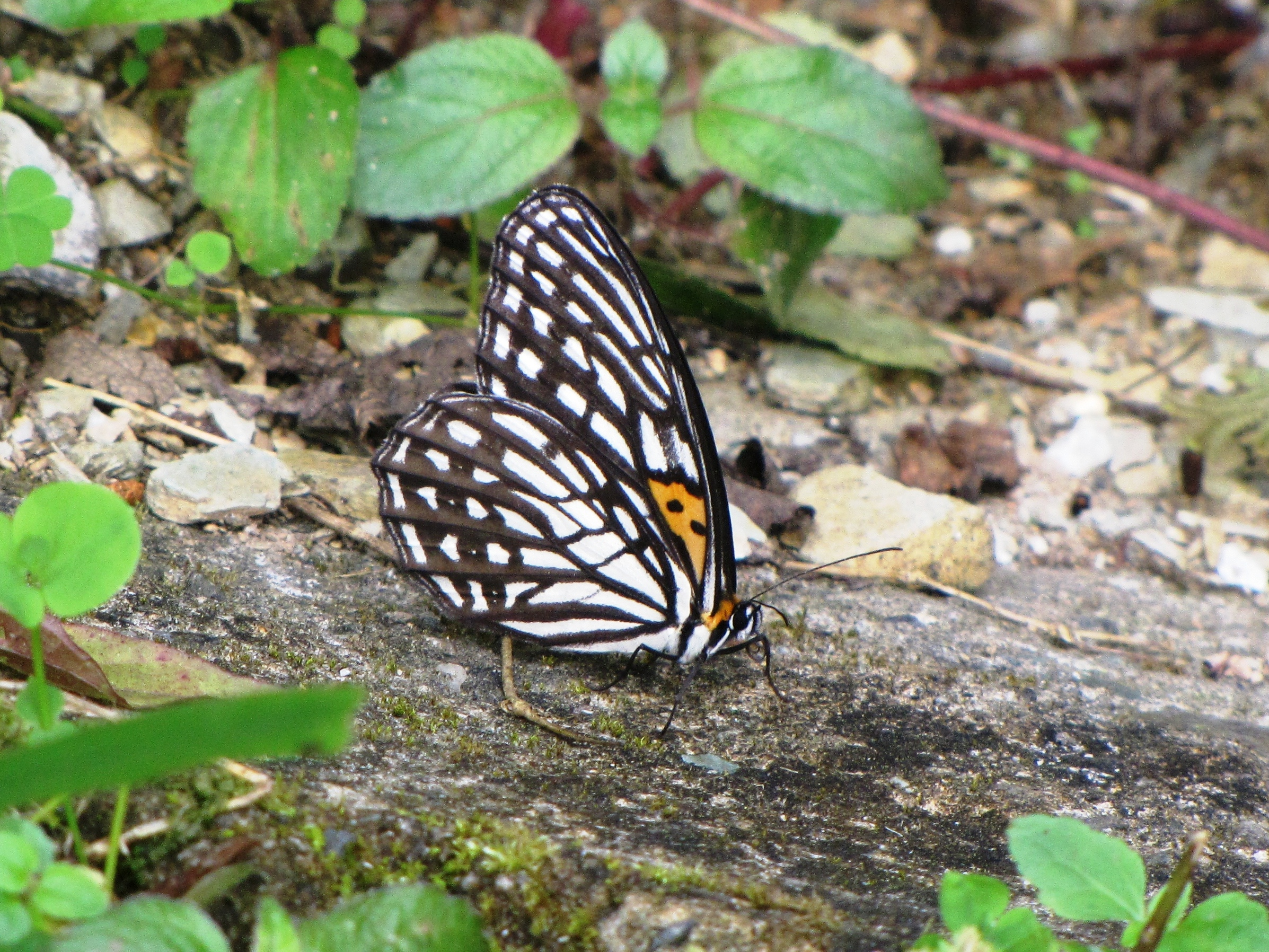

Scientific classification
- Domain: Eukaryota
- Kingdom: Animalia
- Phylum: Arthropoda
- Class: Insecta
- Order: Lepidoptera
- Family: Nymphalidae
- Genus: Orinoma
- Species: O. damaris

Binomial name
- Orinoma damaris Gray, 1846

= Orinoma damaris =

Species of butterfly

Orinoma damaris, the tigerbrown, is a species of satyrine butterfly found in Asia.

== Subspecies ==
- Orinoma damaris damaris
- Orinoma damaris harmostus Fruhstorfer, 1911
