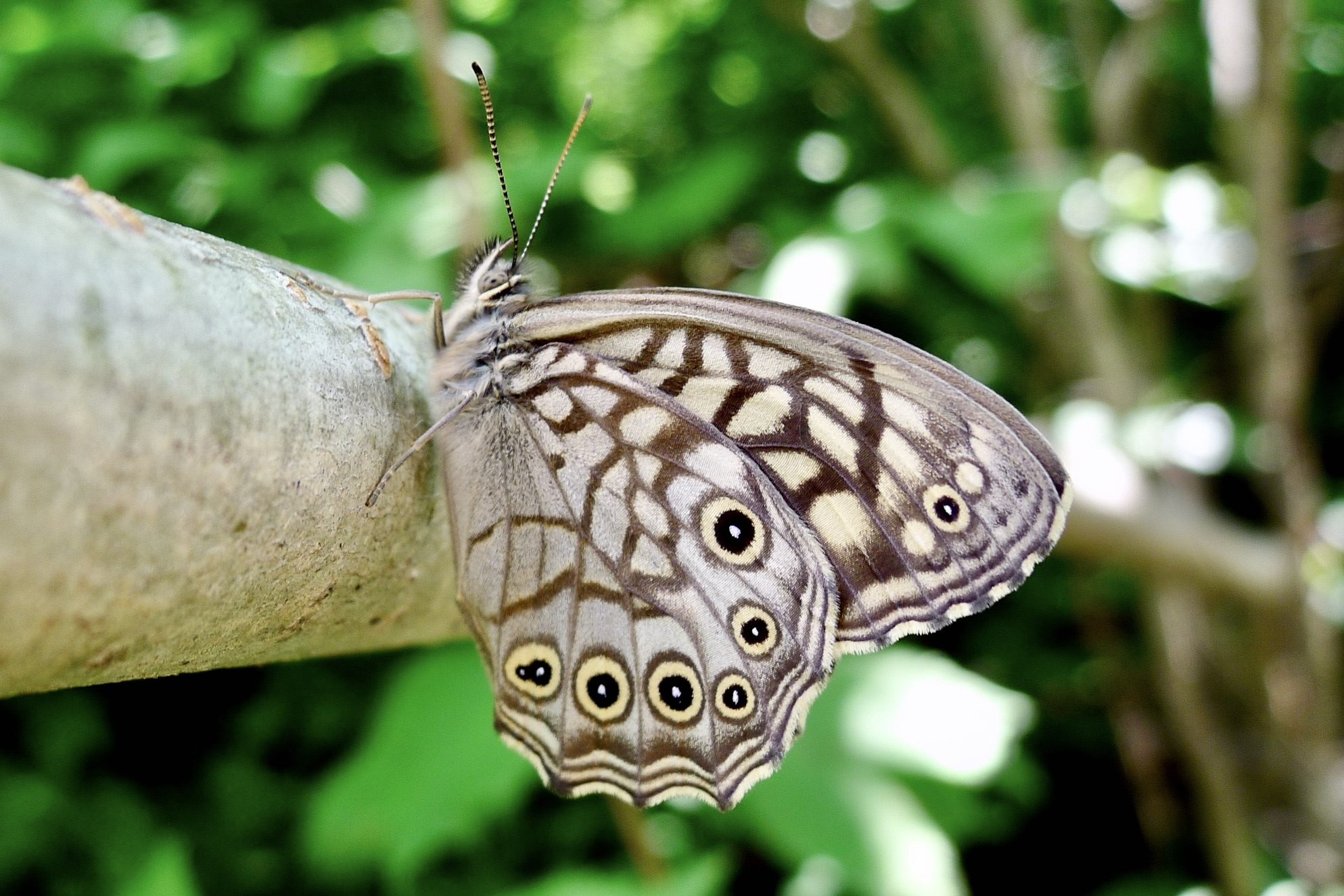

Scientific classification
- Domain: Eukaryota
- Kingdom: Animalia
- Phylum: Arthropoda
- Class: Insecta
- Order: Lepidoptera
- Family: Nymphalidae
- Genus: Kirinia
- Species: K. epimenides

Binomial name
- Kirinia epimenides (Ménétries, 1859)

Synonyms
- Lasiommata epimenides Ménétries, 1859; Neope fentoni Butler, 1877

= Kirinia epimenides =

Species of butterfly

Kirinia epimenides is a butterfly in the family Nymphalidae (Satyrinae). It is found in the East Palearctic in Amur, eastern China, Korea, Ussuri, Japan.

== Subspecies ==
- Kirinia epimenides epimenides
- Kirinia epimenides atratus Kurentzov, 1941
