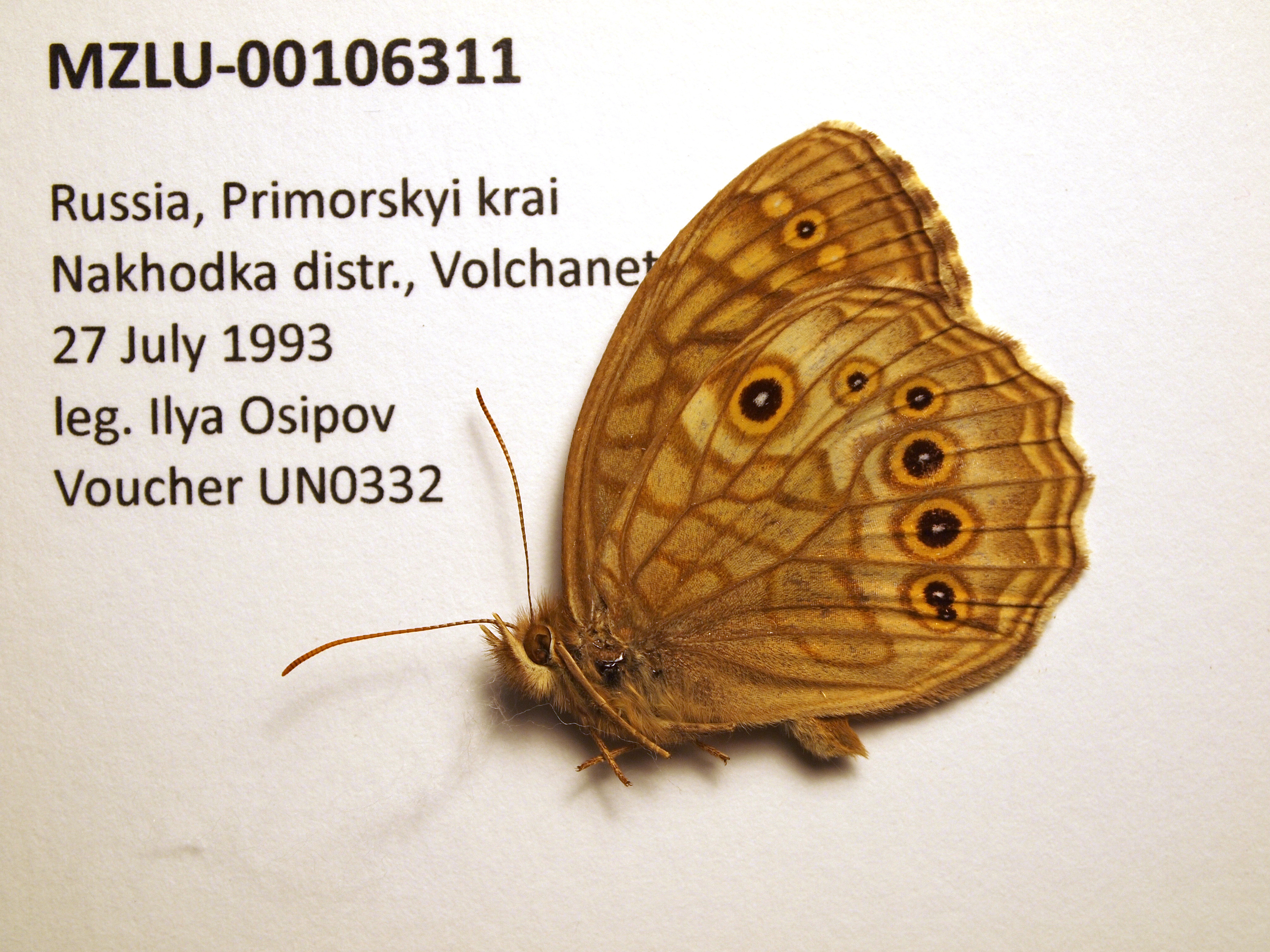

Scientific classification
- Domain: Eukaryota
- Kingdom: Animalia
- Phylum: Arthropoda
- Class: Insecta
- Order: Lepidoptera
- Family: Nymphalidae
- Genus: Kirinia
- Species: K. epaminondas

Binomial name
- Kirinia epaminondas (Staudinger, 1887)

Synonyms
- Pararge epaminondas Staudinger, 1887; Pararge epamenides var? epaminondas Staudinger, 1887

= Kirinia epaminondas =

Asian butterfly species of family Nymphalidae

Kirinia epaminondas is a Palaearctic butterfly of the family Nymphalidae. It was described by Otto Staudinger in 1887.

== Distribution ==
Kirinia epaminondas occurs in the Amur Oblast and Primorsky Krai of the Russian Far East, as well as in East China, Korea and Japan.

== Habitat and host plants ==
The habitat of K. epaminondas consists of dry, thin forests and shrubby habitats. Host plants include Brachypodium spp., Poa ochotensis and Poa angustifolia.

== Behaviour ==
Butterflies are on wing in July and August.
