= Nosea hainanensis =

Scientific classification
- Kingdom: Animalia
- Phylum: Arthropoda
- Class: Insecta
- Order: Lepidoptera
- Family: Nymphalidae
- Subtribe: Parargina
- Genus: Nosea; Koiwaya, 1993
- Species: N. hainanensis

Binomial name
- Nosea hainanensis Koiwaya, 1993

Species of butterfly

Nosea hainanensis is only species in the butterfly genus Nosea of the family Nymphalidae endemic to China.

== Subspecies ==
- Nosea hainanensis hainanensis
- Nosea hainanensis guangxiensis Chou & Li, 1994 (Guangxi)
