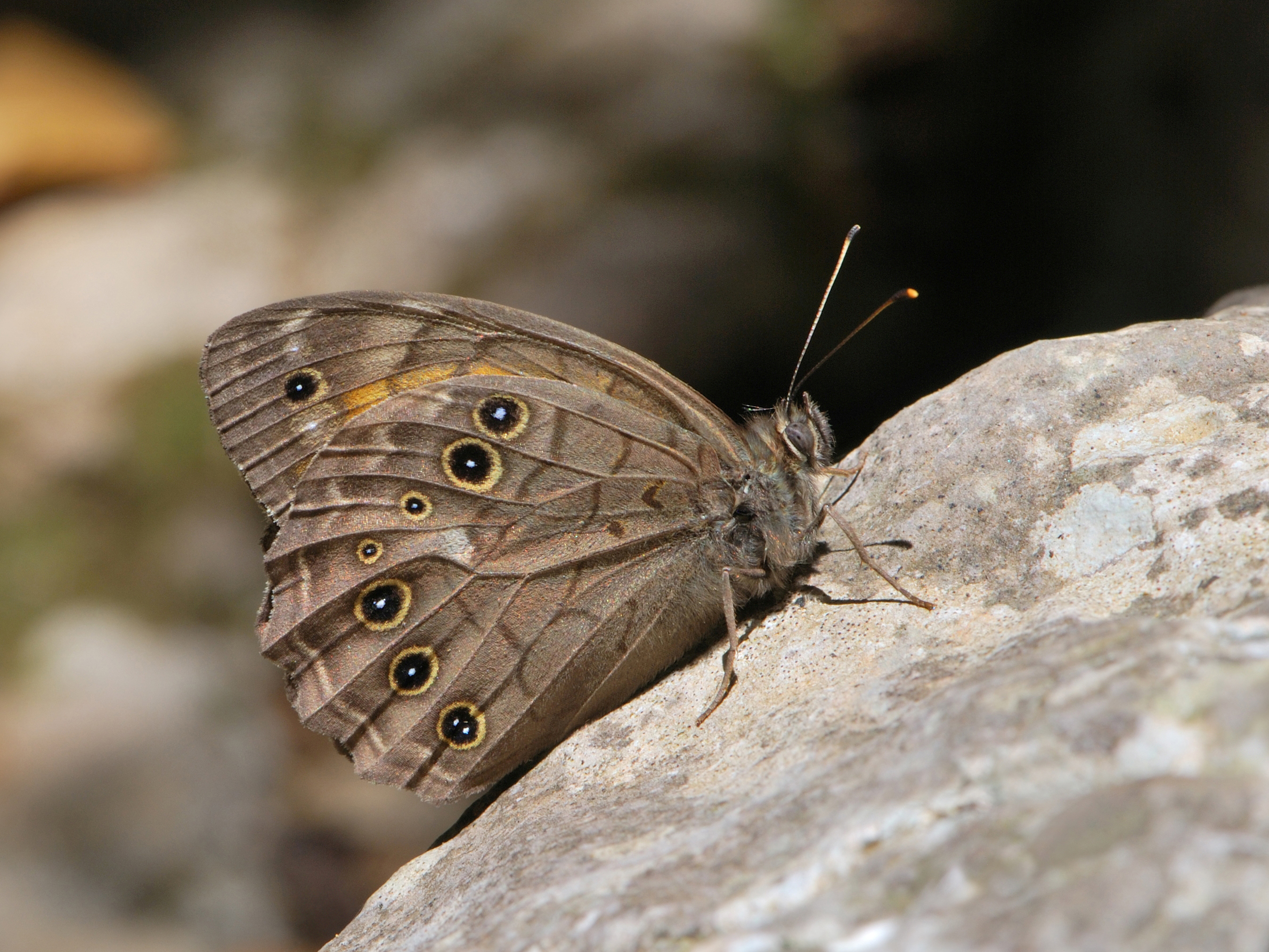
- Kirinia roxelana, male

Scientific classification
- Domain: Eukaryota
- Kingdom: Animalia
- Phylum: Arthropoda
- Class: Insecta
- Order: Lepidoptera
- Family: Nymphalidae
- Subfamily: Satyrinae
- Tribe: Satyrini
- Subtribe: Parargina
- Genus: Kirinia; Moore, 1893

Synonyms
- Esperarge Nekrutenko, 1988; Esperia Nekrutenko, 1987 (preocc.); Esperella Nekrutenko, 1987 (preocc.)

= Kirinia =

Genus of butterflies

Kirinia is a genus of butterflies of the family Nymphalidae found in Europe and Asia.

== Species ==
Listed alphabetically:

- Kirinia climene
- Kirinia epaminondas
- Kirinia epimenides
- Kirinia eversmanni (Eversmann, 1847) Kazakhstan, Ghissaro-Darvaz, Pamiro-Alai
- Kirinia roxelana
