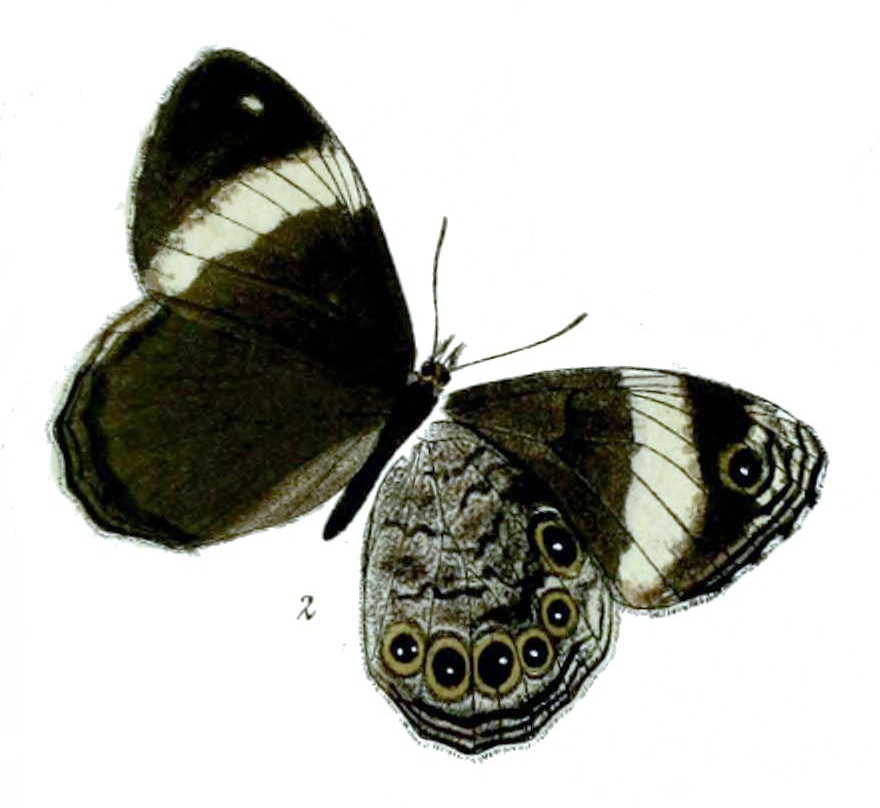

Scientific classification
- Domain: Eukaryota
- Kingdom: Animalia
- Phylum: Arthropoda
- Class: Insecta
- Order: Lepidoptera
- Family: Nymphalidae
- Genus: Chonala
- Species: C. masoni

Binomial name
- Chonala masoni (Elwes, 1883)

Synonyms
- Debis masoni Elwes, 1882

= Chonala masoni =

Chumbi wall

Species of butterfly

Chonala masoni, the Chumbi wall, is a species of satyrine butterfly found in Bhutan, China and north-eastern India.

The species is named the Chumbi wall after the Chumbi Valley where it was "presumed" to have been collected by a native collector and passed on to Henry John Elwes in 1881 when he visited Sikkim with Frederick DuCane Godman. It was originally described as a species in the genus Debis.
