= Parargina =

Scientific classification
- Domain: Eukaryota
- Kingdom: Animalia
- Phylum: Arthropoda
- Class: Insecta
- Order: Lepidoptera
- Family: Nymphalidae
- Subfamily: Satyrinae
- Tribe: Satyrini
- Subtribe: Parargina; Tutt, 1896

Subtribe of butterflies

Parargina is a subtribe of butterflies of the subfamily Satyrinae.

== Genera ==
- Chonala Moore, 1893
- Kirinia Moore, 1893
- Lasiommata Westwood, 1849
- Lopinga Moore, 1893
- Nosea Koiwaya, 1993
  - Nosea hainanensis Koiwaya, 1993
- Orinoma Gray, 1846
- Pararge Hübner, 1819
- Rhaphicera Butler, 1867
- Tatinga Moore, 1893
  - Tatinga thibetana (Oberthür 1876)
