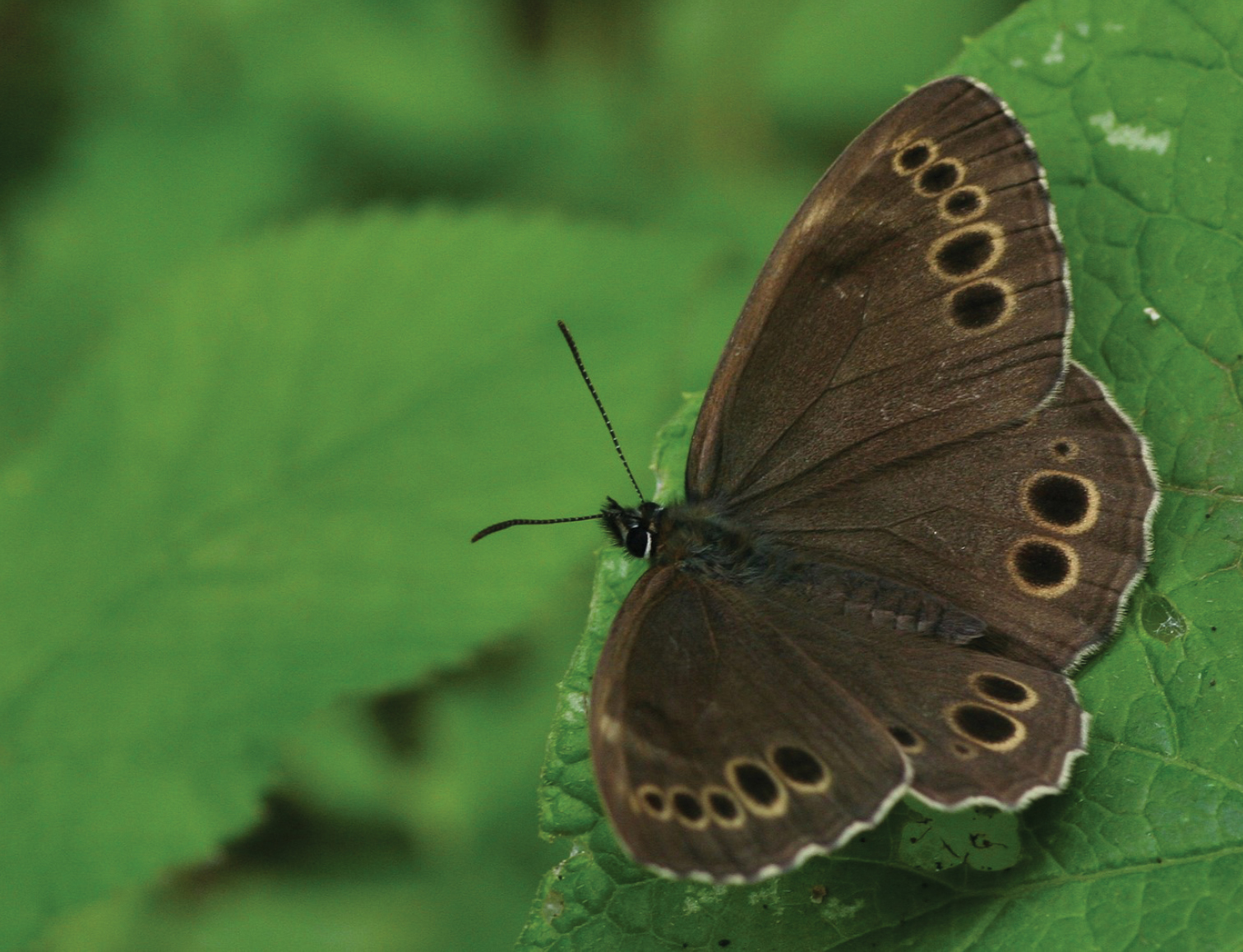

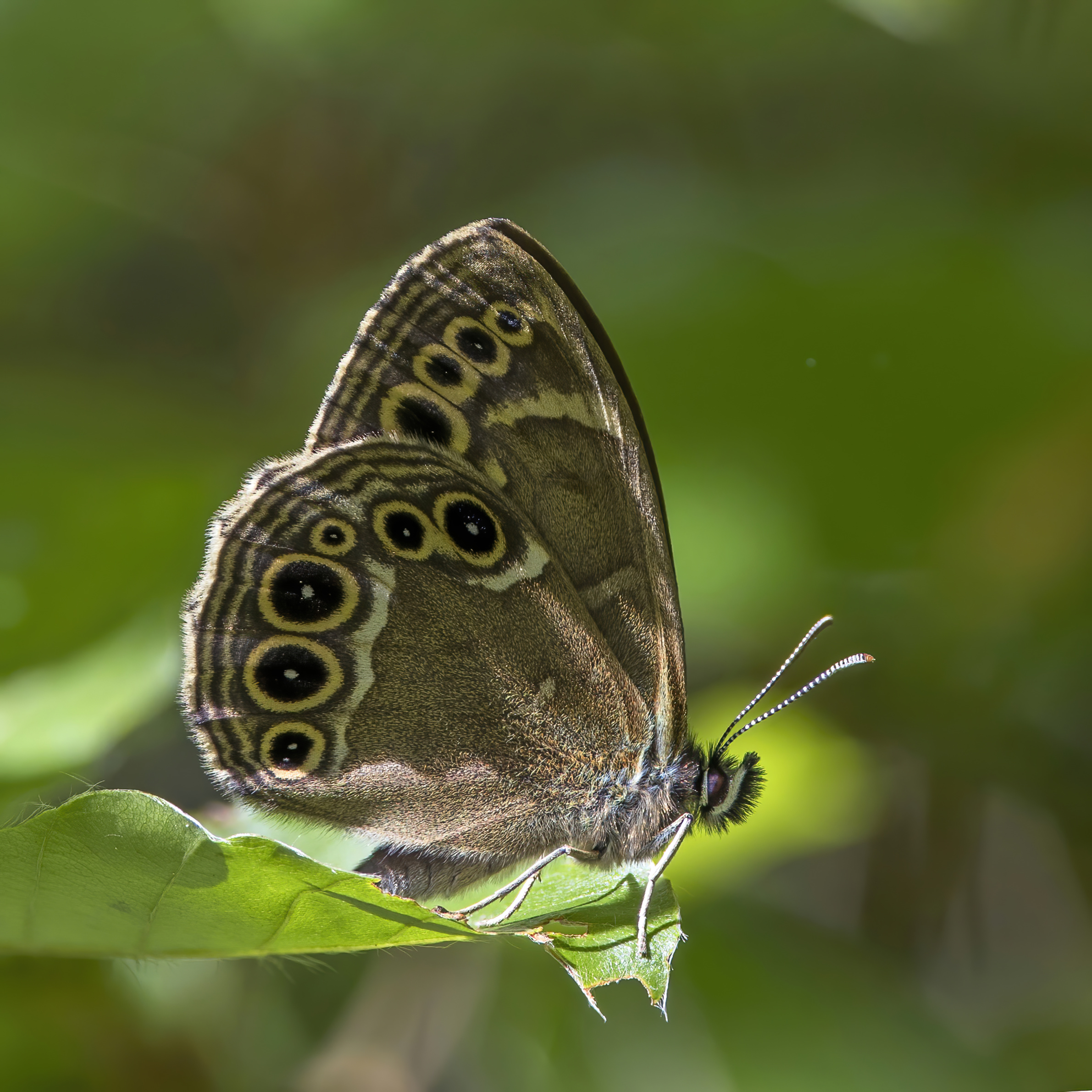

Scientific classification
- Kingdom: Animalia
- Phylum: Arthropoda
- Clade: Pancrustacea
- Class: Insecta
- Order: Lepidoptera
- Family: Nymphalidae
- Genus: Lopinga
- Species: L. achine

Binomial name
- Lopinga achine (Scopoli, 1763)

= Lopinga achine =

Woodland brown

Species of butterfly

Lopinga achine, the woodland brown, is a Palearctic butterfly in the family Nymphalidae.

== Description ==
The forewing length is 19–29 mm. The wingspan of the butterfly is from 45 to 55 millimeters . The wings are grey-brown above and below, with round dark spots of varying sizes in yellow rims on the outer part. On the underside of the wings along the outer edge are yellow lines with a black line between them. Sexual dimorphism is weakly expressed.

== Description in Seitz ==
P. achine Scop. (= dejanira L.) (45 g). Dark brown: forewing with 5—6 eye-rings forming a chain, hindwing with 2—4 such rings. Underside proximally to the ocelli with a white distal band which is variable and may be so much reduced that the row of ocelli is placed within the ground-colour. Deviations in the band occur especially often in alpine specimens, though singly also in other places, ab. mendelensis Lowe being based on such variation. From West Europe throughout Central and North Europe, Siberia and North China to Japan, northward to Livonia. North Russia and Amurland. southward to Northern Italy. — In the east of the area there occur specimens with the eye-rings on the upperside enlarged, ab. achinoides Btl. (= eximia Stgr.). the specimens being moreover often of a brighter colour: but they fly together with individuals which are not distinguishable from European ones. — Larva green, with yellowish brown head.3 dark dorsal hues and pale double lateral stripe; till May on Lolium, Poa, Triticum, etc. Pupa green, with angular head and a thoracic tubercle. The butterflies occur in woods of tall leaved trees, especially if there is a luxurious undergrowth, in June and July, the flight being dancing. They pitch on bushes, drink on damp places of the roads and imbibe the sap of wounded trees. Widely distributed in Europe, but sporadic and usually not very plentiful, being on the contrary extremely common in East Asia, assembling sometimes in swarms. They even occur in abundance on the islands near the Pacific coast (Yjezo, Askold). The males appear so much earlier than the males that they usually are already worn when the first females emerge.

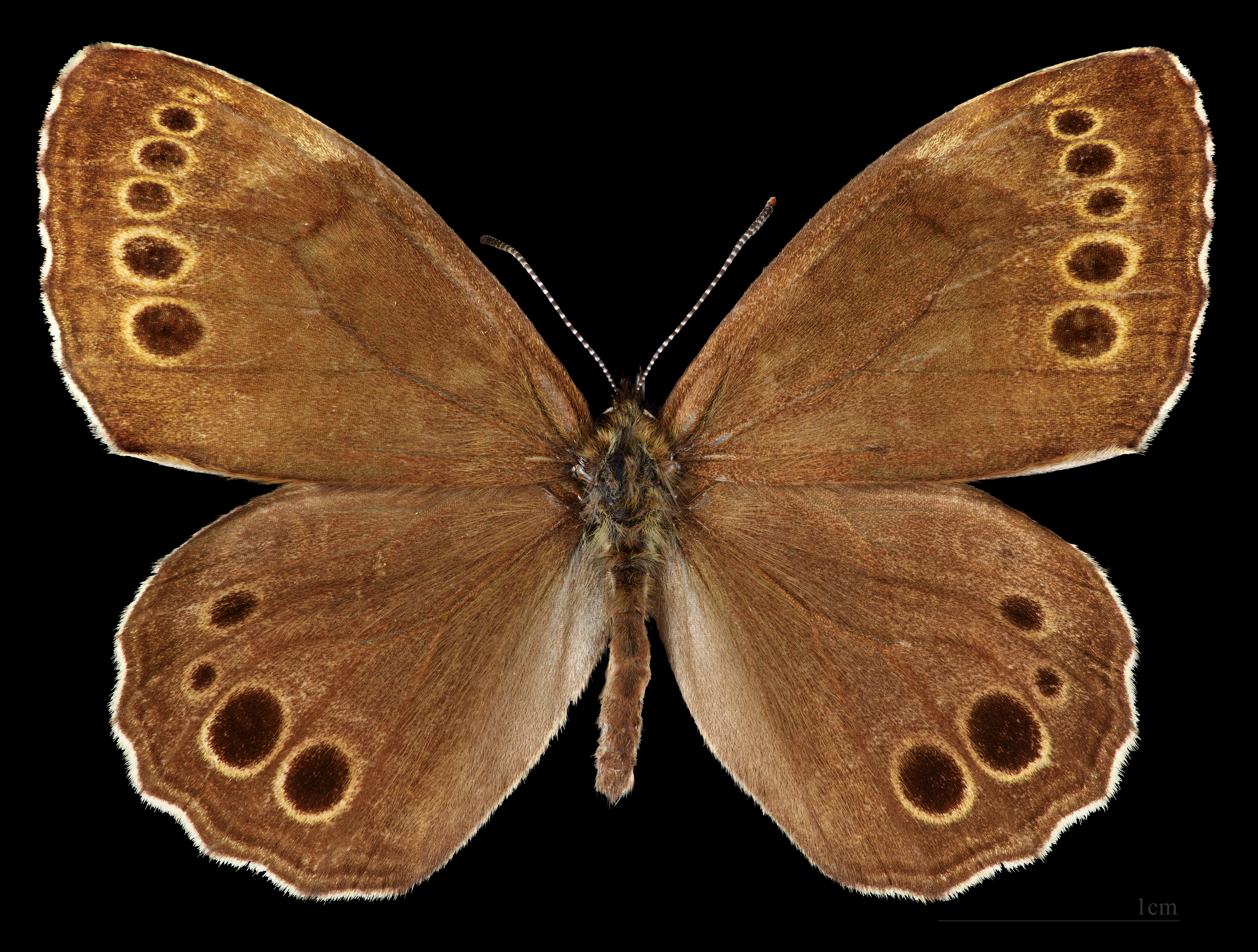
Lopinga achine ♂

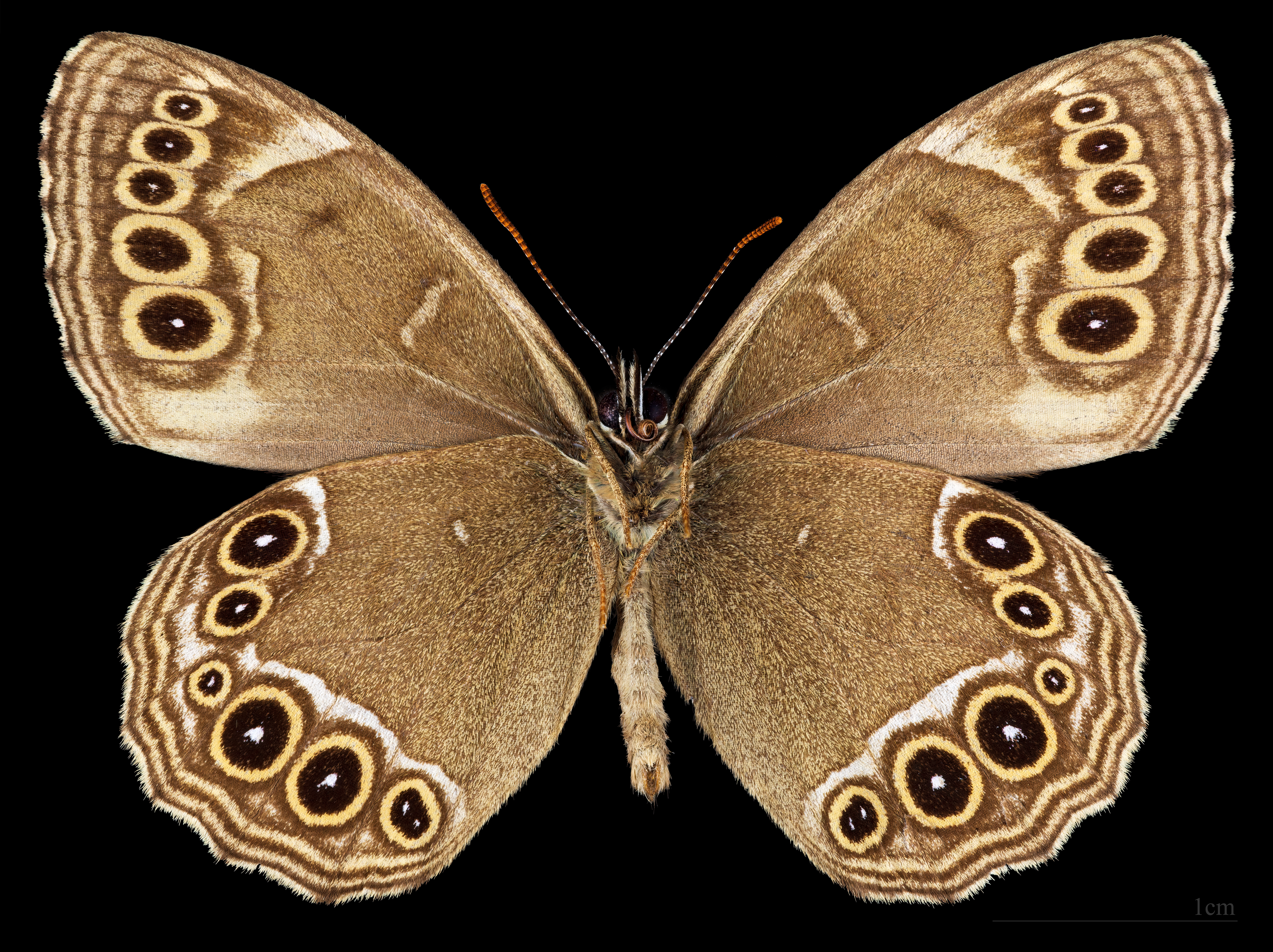
Lopinga achine ♂ △

== Habitat ==
Inhabits damp forest edges, forest road edges, clearings, and river banks. A shade-loving species. In the Carpathians, it does not rise above 400 m above sea level. In Siberia, it is found among meadow areas near groves and in clearings in pine forests, along forest roads, clearings, among bird cherry and shrub thickets in the valleys of steppe springs, on forested mountain slopes, and in meadows in the valleys of streams and rivers near them. In the mountains of the Amur basin, along slopes with larch and birch forests and rocky outcrops, it reaches the alpine mountains .

== Biology ==
Everywhere, only one generation develops per year. The butterfly's flight occurs from late May to late July (some specimens may persist until August). Males may sometimes form aggregations on moist soil, near water, or on animal droppings. Females are generally quite secretive and fly only high in the crowns of shrubs and trees. The butterflies primarily rest on tree trunks and vertical branches, rarely visiting flowers. The eggs are spherical, yellowish or whitish-green. The female "drops" the eggs one by one onto various types of grass grains while in flight.The caterpillar develops and overwinters from August to May–June of the following year, preferring to stay at the base of the host plant, pupating on grass stems. It is green, with three dark lines along the back and a double light stripe on the sides. The head is yellowish-brown with white dots. The last segment has two whitish points. The caterpillars' host plants include Elymus repens, Agropyron species, Calamagrostisspp., Deschampsia spp., Elymus caninus, Elymus spp., Brachypodium sylvaticum, Melica nutans, Poa annua, Poa spp., Lolium temulentum and Triticum ..

== Distribution ==
The species is widely distributed, but uncommon and local in continental Europe. Most of the suitable habitats for the species have been lost. The woodland brown may be found in warm openings of damp unmanaged mature forest. It is widespread in the Palearctic region: in the south of the forest and forest-steppe zone of Eurasia from France to Japan, on Sakhalin, and the Southern Kuril Islands. The species is widespread throughout the north of Eastern Europe. In the south, the species penetrates to the forest-steppe zone of the central and eastern regions of Ukraine (Kiev, Cherkasy, Poltava, and Kharkiv regions). Further to the east, the southern border of the species' range runs along the forest-steppe of Russia to the Northern Don region. In Lithuania and Belarus, the species is very rare; in Poland, several populations have been recorded from the northeastern part and in the mountains. Finds are known from Slovakia, the foothills of the Carpathians in Ukraine, Western Hungary, and Romania .

== Protection ==
In the Red List of the International Union for Conservation of Nature (IUCN), the species has protection category 3 (VU - vulnerable taxon, threatened with extinction in the future). It is included in the Red Data Book of European Butterflies with the category SPEC3 – a species that lives both in Europe and abroad, but is endangered within Europe. Included in the Red Data Book of Eastern Fennoscandia for Finland (1998) (category 2), Belarus (2004) (category 3). The species is protected in Poland and Slovakia, where it is critically endangered in the latter. It has already become extinct in several Western European countries (Bulgaria, Belgium, Luxembourg).
