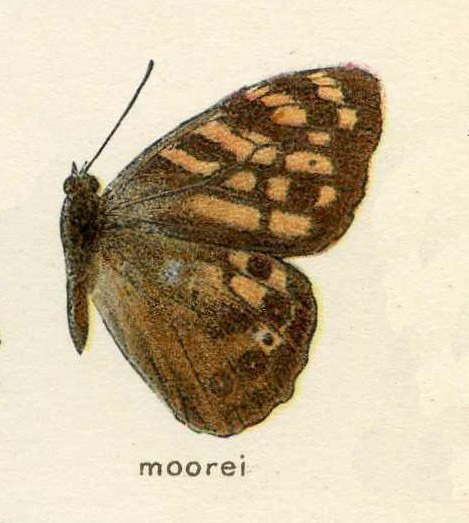
- Upperside - from Adalbert Seitz

Scientific classification
- Domain: Eukaryota
- Kingdom: Animalia
- Phylum: Arthropoda
- Class: Insecta
- Order: Lepidoptera
- Family: Nymphalidae
- Genus: Rhaphicera
- Species: R. moorei

Binomial name
- Rhaphicera moorei (Butler, 1867)

= Rhaphicera moorei =

Small tawny wall

Species of butterfly

Rhaphicera moorei, the small tawny wall, is a species of satyrine butterfly found in western China, India (Simla and Sikkim) and Tibet.

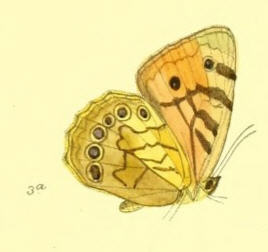
Underside of female

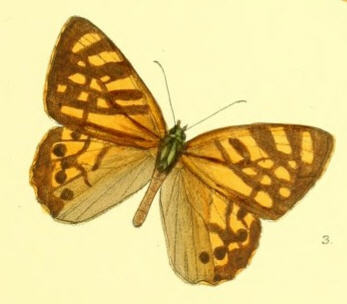
Male
