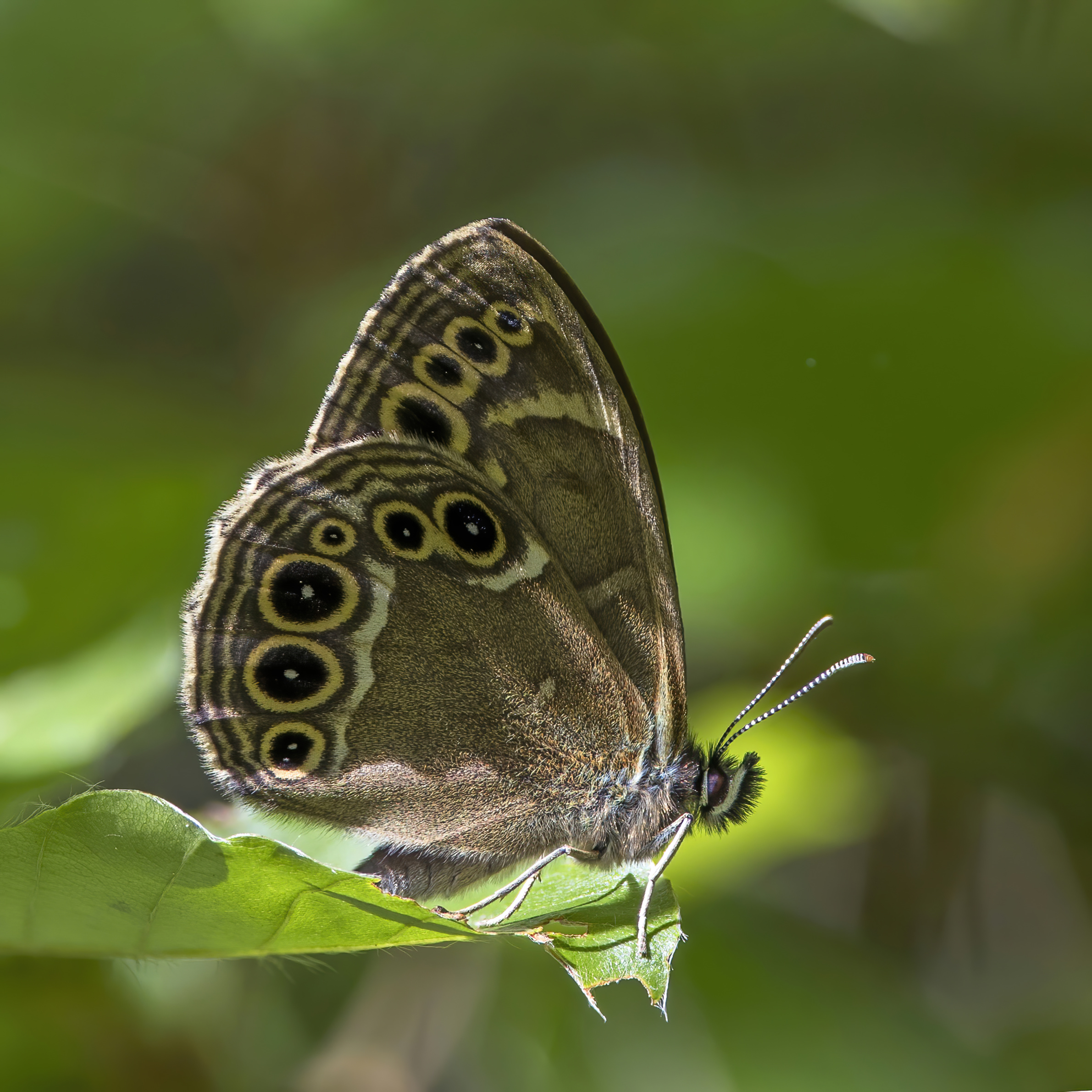
- Woodland brown (Lopinga achine)

Scientific classification
- Domain: Eukaryota
- Kingdom: Animalia
- Phylum: Arthropoda
- Class: Insecta
- Order: Lepidoptera
- Family: Nymphalidae
- Subtribe: Parargina
- Genus: Lopinga; Moore, 1893

Synonyms
- Crebeta Moore, 1893; Polyargia Verity, 1957

= Lopinga =

Genus of butterflies

Lopinga is a genus of butterflies of the family Nymphalidae. Lopinga achine, a threatened species classified as vulnerable in Swedish Red data book (Ehnström et al., 1993) This butterfly frequents glades in partly open oak woodland where female egg-laying butterflies would glade by host plants and lay their eggs. Suggesting that Lopinga achine has specific habitat requirements that can only be met with the glades that female butterflies prefer to lay their eggs.

== Species ==
- Lopinga achine (Scopoli, 1763) – woodland brown
- Lopinga catena (Leech, 1890) West China
- Lopinga deidamia (Eversmann, 1851) China
- Lopinga kasumi (Yoshino, 1995) Taipaishan, Shannxi, China
- Lopinga dumetorum (Oberthür, 1890) China
- Lopinga eckweileri Görgner, 1990 China, Sichuan, Nanping
- Lopinga fulvescens (Alphéraky, 1889) China
- Lopinga gerdae Nordström, 1934 China
- Lopinga lehmanni (Forster, 1980) China
- Lopinga nemorum (Oberthür, 1890) China
