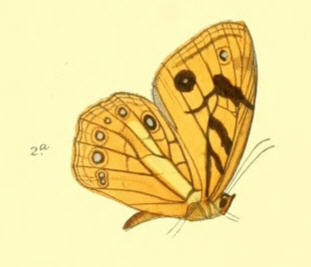

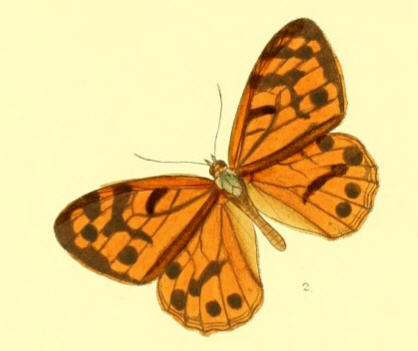

Scientific classification
- Domain: Eukaryota
- Kingdom: Animalia
- Phylum: Arthropoda
- Class: Insecta
- Order: Lepidoptera
- Family: Nymphalidae
- Genus: Rhaphicera
- Species: R. satricus

Binomial name
- Rhaphicera satricus Doubleday, 1849

= Rhaphicera satricus =

Large tawny wall

Species of butterfly

Rhaphicera satricus, the large tawny wall, is a species of satyrine butterfly found in western China, India (Simla and Sikkim) and Tibet.
