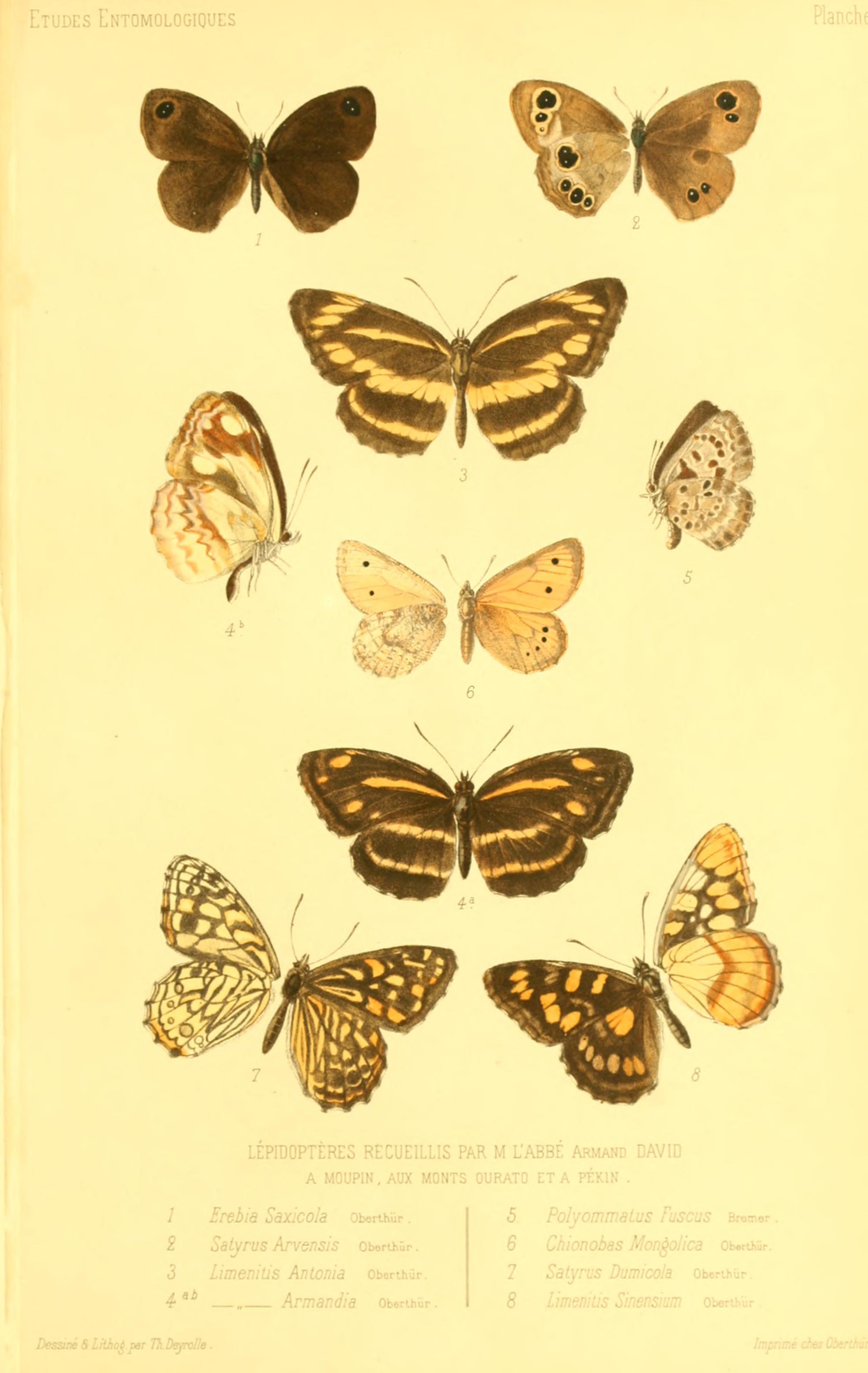
- Rhaphicera dumicola in Charles Oberthür's Ètudes d'entomologie: Lépidoptères de Chine

Scientific classification
- Domain: Eukaryota
- Kingdom: Animalia
- Phylum: Arthropoda
- Class: Insecta
- Order: Lepidoptera
- Family: Nymphalidae
- Subtribe: Parargina
- Genus: Rhaphicera; Butler, 1867

= Rhaphicera =

Genus of insects

Rhaphicera is a genus of butterflies of the family Nymphalidae found in the Indomalayan realm (India and China).

== Species ==
Listed alphabetically:

- Rhaphicera dumicola western China
- Rhaphicera moorei
- Rhaphicera satricus
