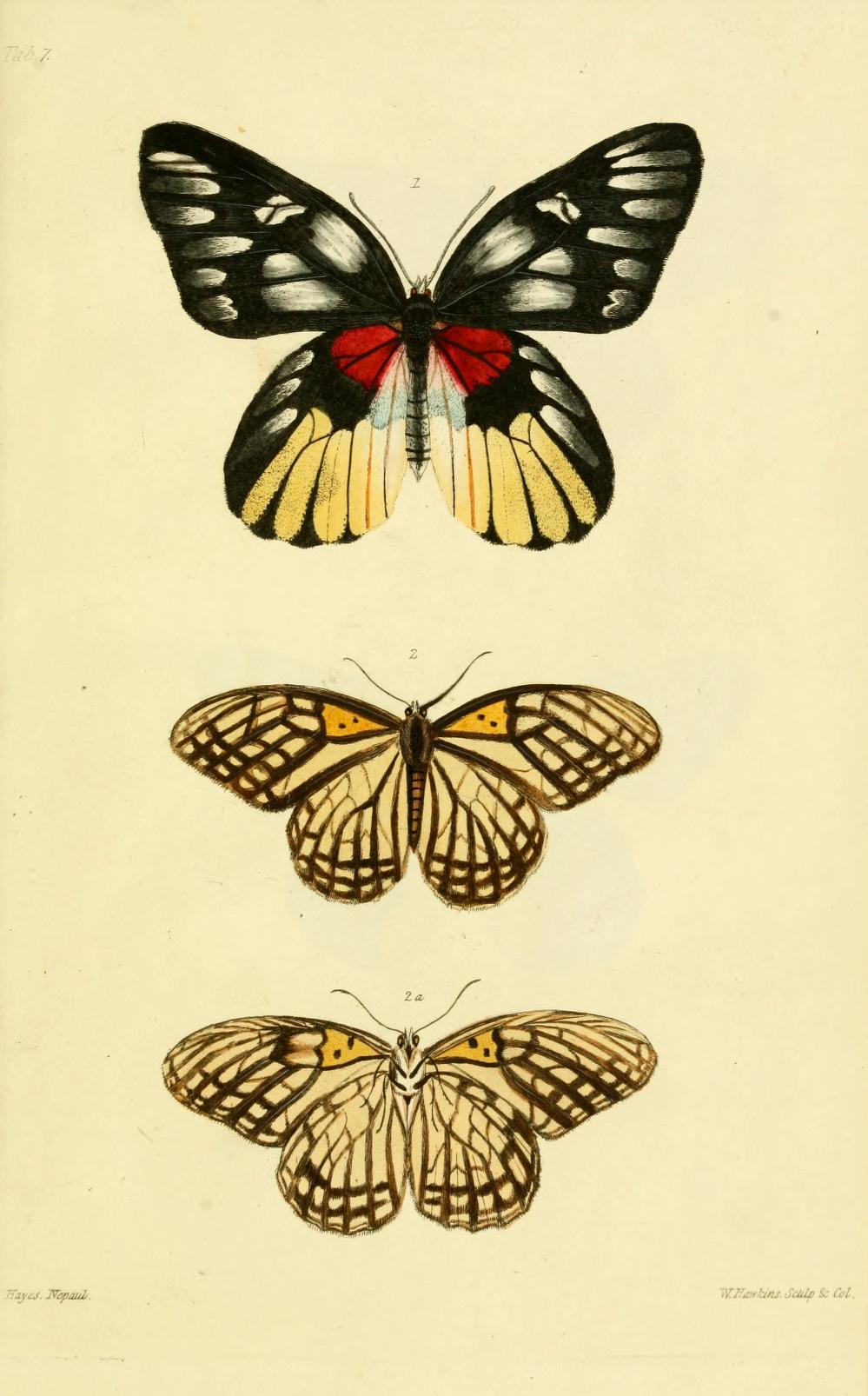
- Orinoma damaris with Delias acalis in George Robert Gray's 1846 Descriptions and Figures of Some New Lepidopterous Insects Chiefly from Nepal

Scientific classification
- Kingdom: Animalia
- Phylum: Arthropoda
- Clade: Pancrustacea
- Class: Insecta
- Order: Lepidoptera
- Family: Nymphalidae
- Subtribe: Parargina
- Genus: Orinoma; Gray, 1846

= Orinoma =

Genus of butterflies

Orinoma is a genus of butterflies of the family Nymphalidae found in Asia.

== Species ==
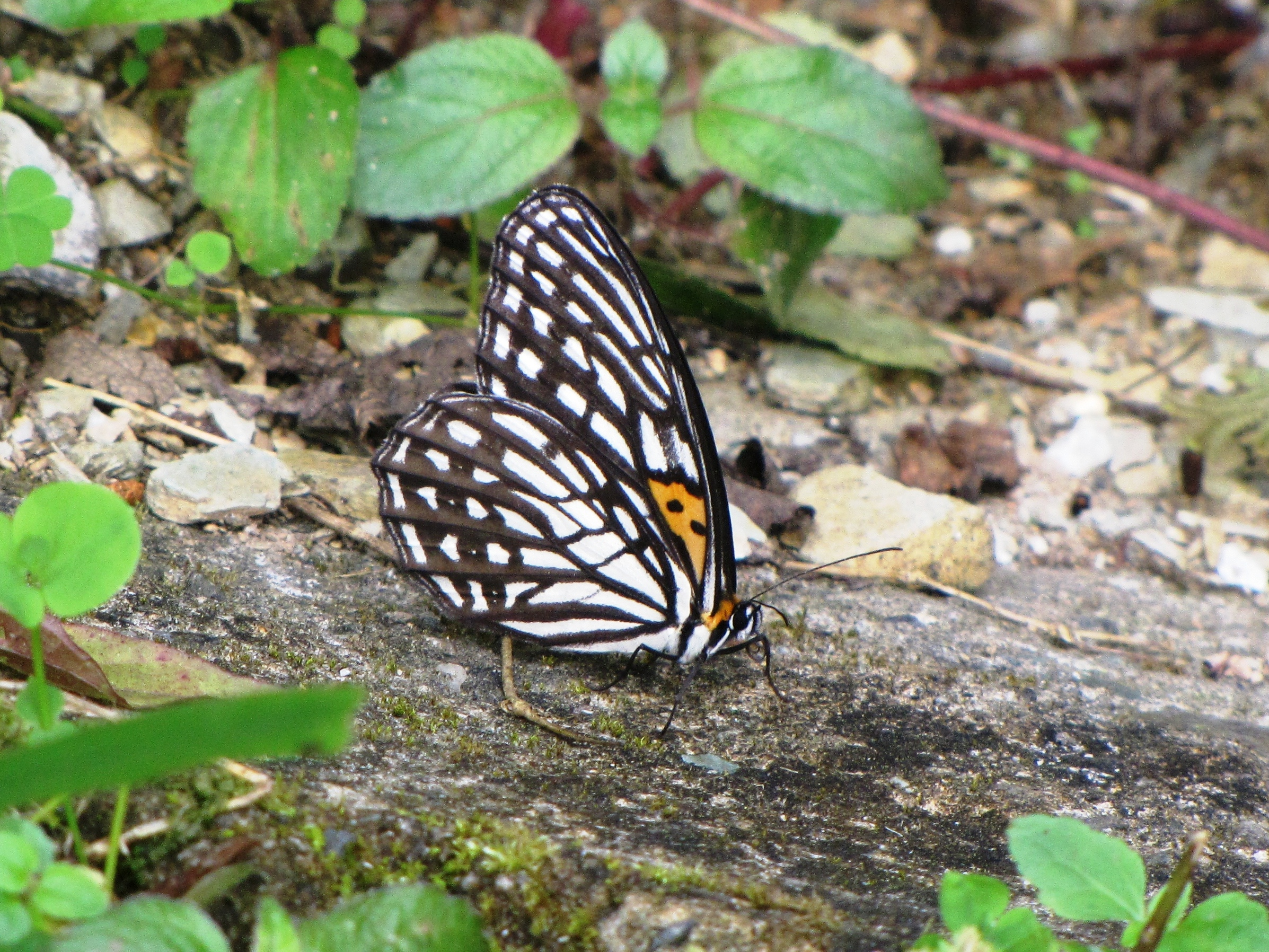
Tigerbrown (Orinoma damaris) at Latpanchor, Darjeeling district, West Bengal, India

Listed alphabetically:

- Orinoma alba Chou & Li, 1994
- Orinoma damaris Gray, 1846 - tigerbrown
