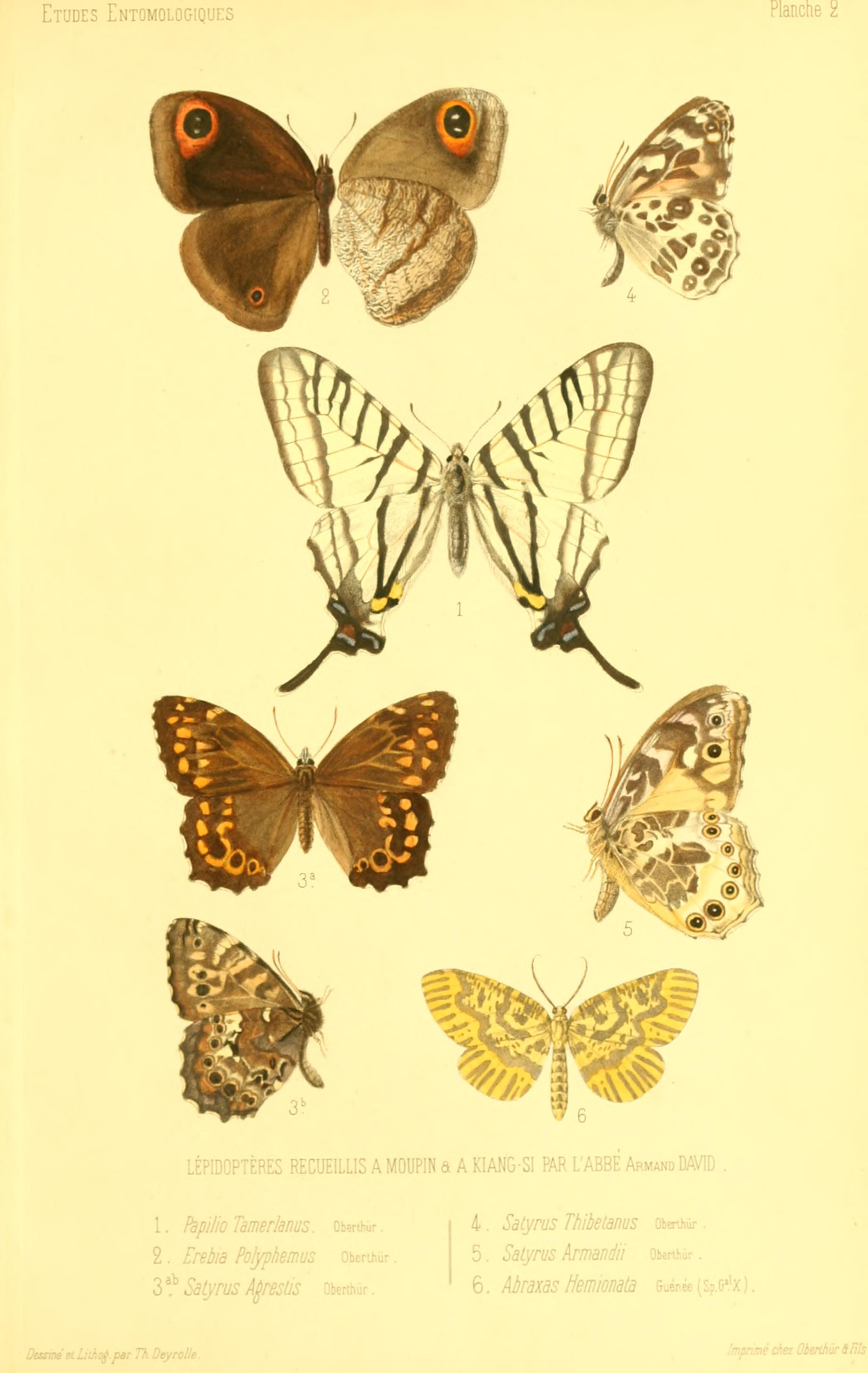
- Tatinga thibetana in Oberthür, 1876 Espèces nouvelles de Lépidopterès recueillis en Chine par M. l'abbé A. David Études d'Entomologie

Scientific classification
- Kingdom: Animalia
- Phylum: Arthropoda
- Class: Insecta
- Order: Lepidoptera
- Family: Nymphalidae
- Subfamily: Satyrinae
- Tribe: Satyrini
- Subtribe: Parargina
- Genus: Tatinga; Moore, 1893
- Species: T. thibetana

Binomial name
- Tatinga thibetana (Oberthür, 1876)

Synonyms
- Satyrus thibetanus Oberthür, 1876; Pararge thibetana; Tatinga thibetanus ab. albicans South, 1913

= Tatinga =

Genus of butterflies

Tatinga thibetana is only species in the butterfly genus Tatinga of the family Nymphalidae found in Asia.

== Subspecies ==
- Tatinga thibetana thibetana
- Tatinga thibetana menpa (Yoshino, 1998) (eastern Tibet)
- Tatinga thibetana tonpa (Yoshino, 1998) (northern Yunnan)
