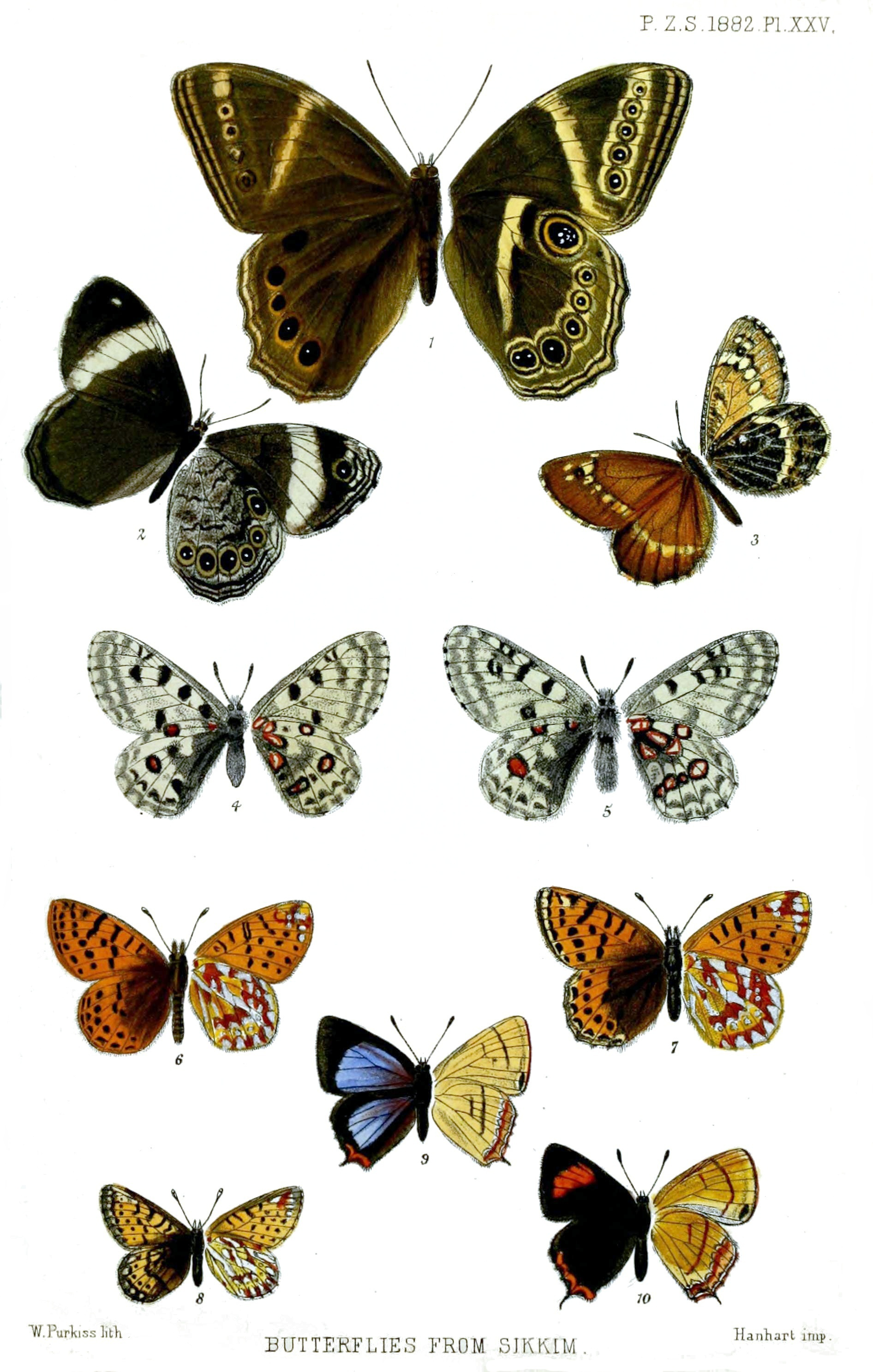
- Chonala masoni (figure 2) in Henry John Elwes's On a Collection of Butterflies from Sikkim

Scientific classification
- Domain: Eukaryota
- Kingdom: Animalia
- Phylum: Arthropoda
- Class: Insecta
- Order: Lepidoptera
- Family: Nymphalidae
- Subtribe: Parargina
- Genus: Chonala; Moore, 1893

= Chonala =

Genus of brush-footed butterflies

Chonala is a genus of butterflies of the family Nymphalidae found in eastern Asia.

== Species ==
Listed alphabetically:

- Chonala episcopalis
- Chonala laurae
- Chonala masoni
- Chonala miyatai
- Chonala praeusta
