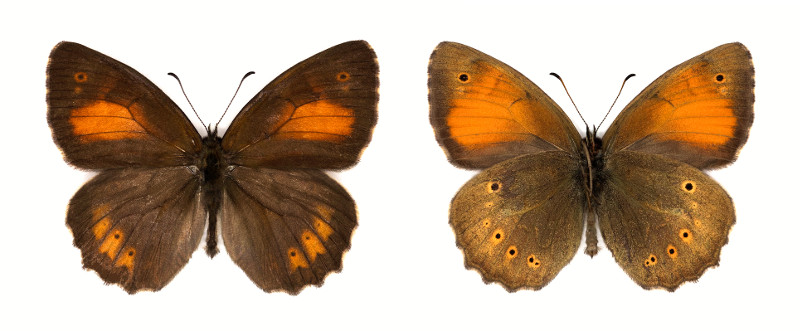

Scientific classification
- Kingdom: Animalia
- Phylum: Arthropoda
- Clade: Pancrustacea
- Class: Insecta
- Order: Lepidoptera
- Family: Nymphalidae
- Genus: Kirinia
- Species: K. climene

Binomial name
- Kirinia climene (Esper, 1783)

Synonyms
- Papilio climene Esper, 1783; Esperarge climene; Pararga clymene var. roxandra Nordmann, 1851; Pararge valentinae Miller, 1923; Pararge tkatshukovi Sheljuzhko, 1925

= Kirinia climene =

Species of butterfly

Kirinia climene, the Iranian Argus, is a butterfly of the family Nymphalidae. It was described by Eugenius Johann Christoph Esper in 1783. It is distributed in Bulgaria, Romania, Yugoslavia, Macedonia, Turkey, Caucasus, Transcaucasia, Syria, Iraq, Iran and southern Russia.

== Description in Seitz ==
P. climene Esp. (= clymene 0. synclimene Hbn.) (45c). Much smaller than the preceding [ roxelana ], the hindwing not so large as compared with the forewing as in roxelana, with the distal margin non-dentate. Ocelli of the hindwing beneath much smaller and less distinct on a unicolorous ground. On the lower parts of the Danube and Volga, in South Russia, Turkey and Asia Minor, said to occur also in the Altai-district. — roxandra H.-Schiff. (= caucasica Nordm.) from Armenia, is beneath brighter and more variegated, there being a white silky spot at the apex of the cell of the hindwing. — The butterflies occur in May and June: they are true insects of the steppes, being also not rare in the plains, especially in stony places, and resemble an Epinephele when on the wing.

== Biology ==
The species inhabits mostly open forests, glades, rocky clearings, embankments and meadows in the elevation range from 1500 to 2300 metres above sea level. The larval host-plants are various grasses, including Poa annua. The eggs are not stuck to the host plant but fall among the foliage. The first instar caterpillar may aestivate until the autumn, at which time it feeds to some extent before overwintering. It feeds again more vigorously in the spring, before pupating in June. The butterflies are on the wing from early July until mid-August. In summer, they are often observed on flowers. When it is hot they prefer shaded areas under tree canopies or in high grasses and often settle on branches and tree trunks, where they are well-camouflaged.

== Subspecies ==
- Kirinia climene climene
- Kirinia climene roxandra (Herrich-Schäffer, [1850]) (Caucasus, Transcausia)
