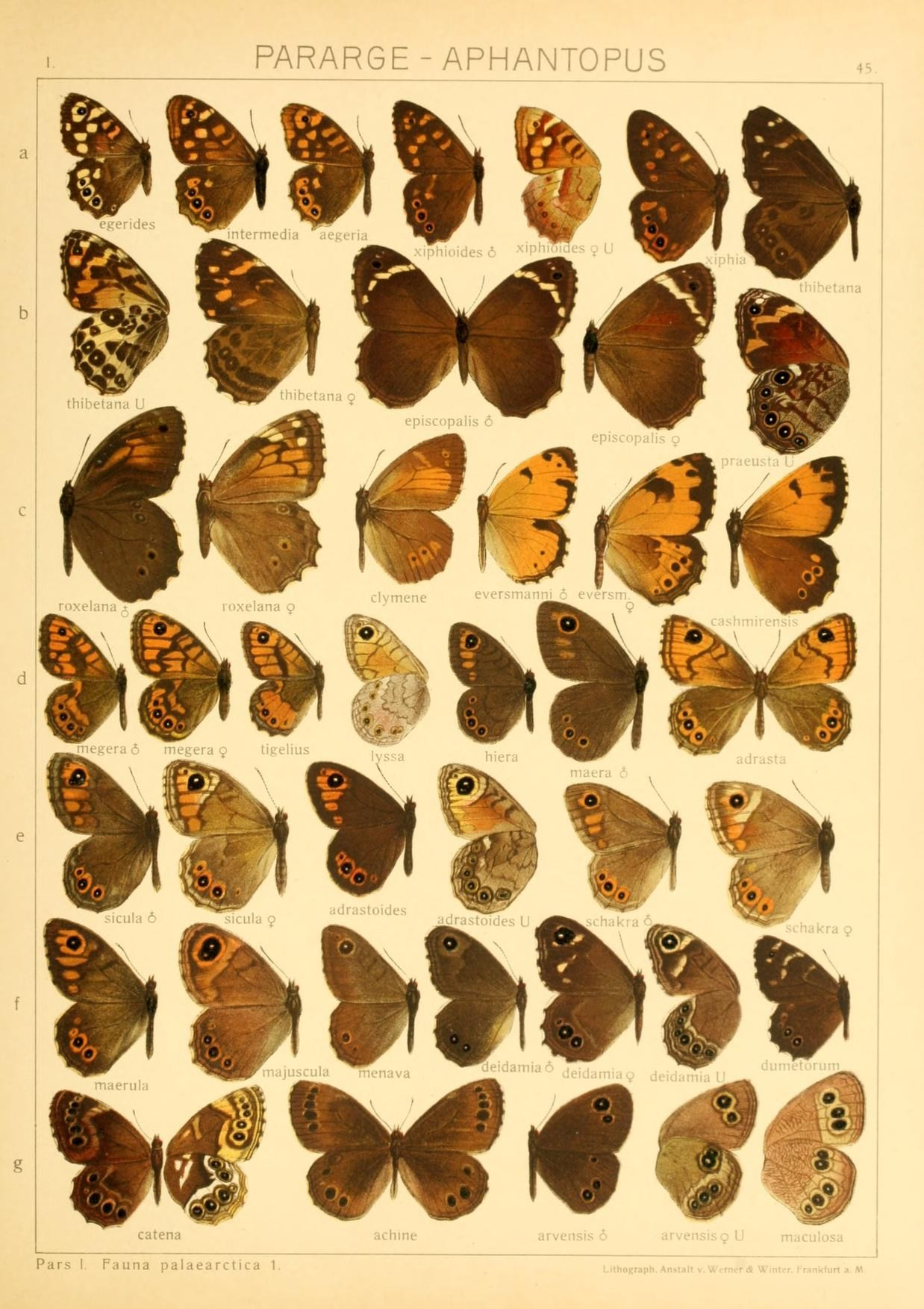
- Aphantopus arvensis in Seitz (45g)

Scientific classification
- Domain: Eukaryota
- Kingdom: Animalia
- Phylum: Arthropoda
- Class: Insecta
- Order: Lepidoptera
- Family: Nymphalidae
- Genus: Aphantopus
- Species: A. arvensis

Binomial name
- Aphantopus arvensis (Oberthür, 1876)

= Aphantopus arvensis =

Species of butterfly

Aphantopus arvensis is a butterfly found in the Palearctic that belongs to the browns family. The species was first described by Charles Oberthur in 1876. It is endemic to western and central China.

== Description from Seitz ==
A. arvensis Oberth. (45g). Similar to the preceding [A. maculosa]; forewing on both sides as a rule with but 2 eye-spots, which are unequal in size. Ocelli of both wings partly pupilled also above. From West China: Mupin, Wa-shan. etc. — The form campana Leech [A. a. campana Leech, 1892], from Ta-tsien-lu is darker above and has much smaller ocelli, On the underside of the hindwing there is a white spot before the costal ocellus and the white distal band which interrupts the chain of ocelli is lighter and more prominent. In May and June.
