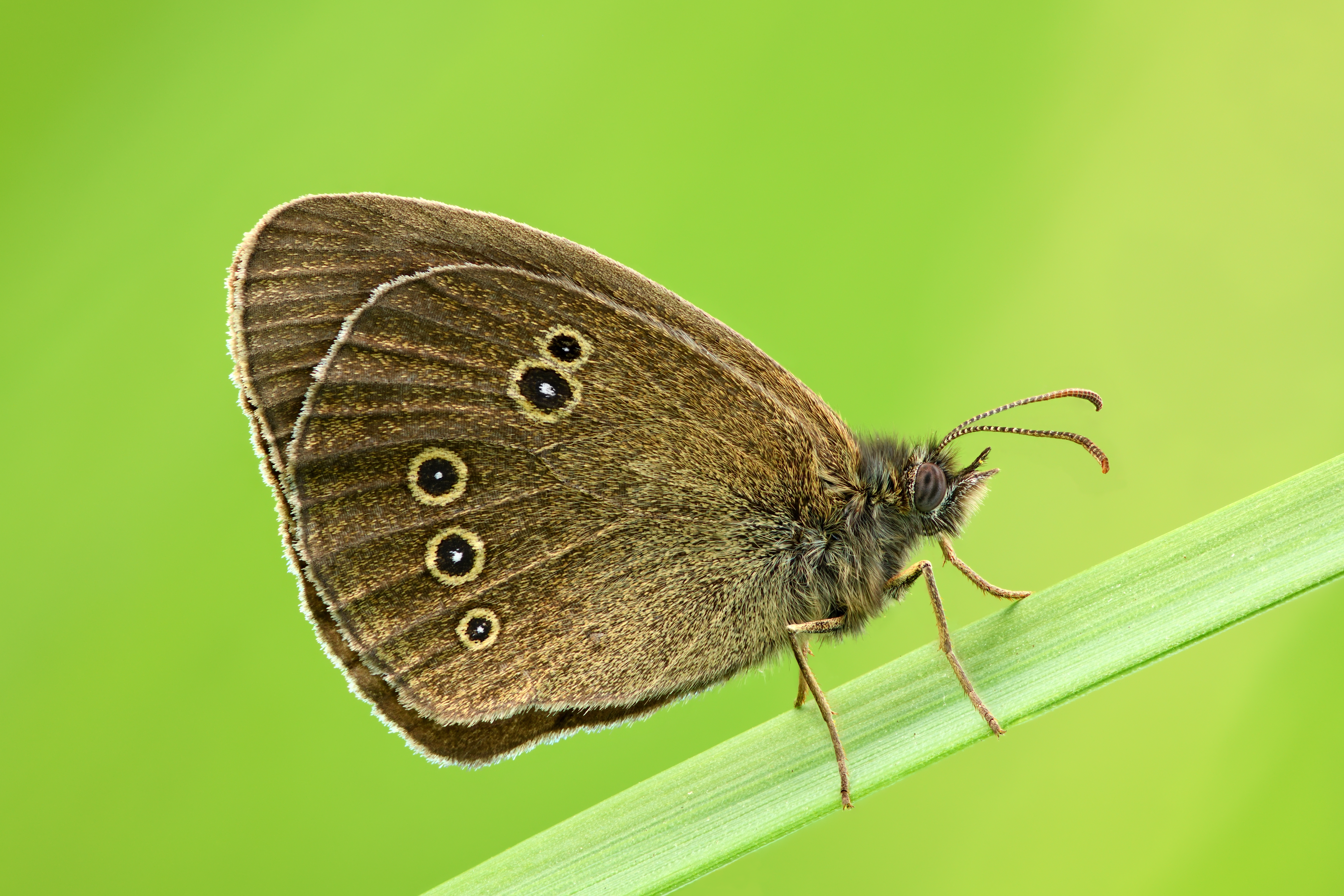

Conservation status
- Least Concern (IUCN 3.1)

Scientific classification
- Kingdom: Animalia
- Phylum: Arthropoda
- Clade: Pancrustacea
- Class: Insecta
- Order: Lepidoptera
- Family: Nymphalidae
- Genus: Aphantopus
- Species: A. hyperantus

Binomial name
- Aphantopus hyperantus (Linnaeus, 1758)

Synonyms
- Papilio hyperantus Linnaeus, 1758; Epinephele hyperanthus (Linnaeus, 1758); Lasiommata hyperanthus (Linnaeus, 1758); Pararge hyperanthus (Linnaeus, 1758); Satyrus hyperanthus (Linnaeus, 1758)

= Ringlet =

Species of butterfly

The ringlet (Aphantopus hyperantus) is a butterfly in the family Nymphalidae. It is only one of the numerous "ringlet" butterflies in the tribe Satyrini.

== Range ==
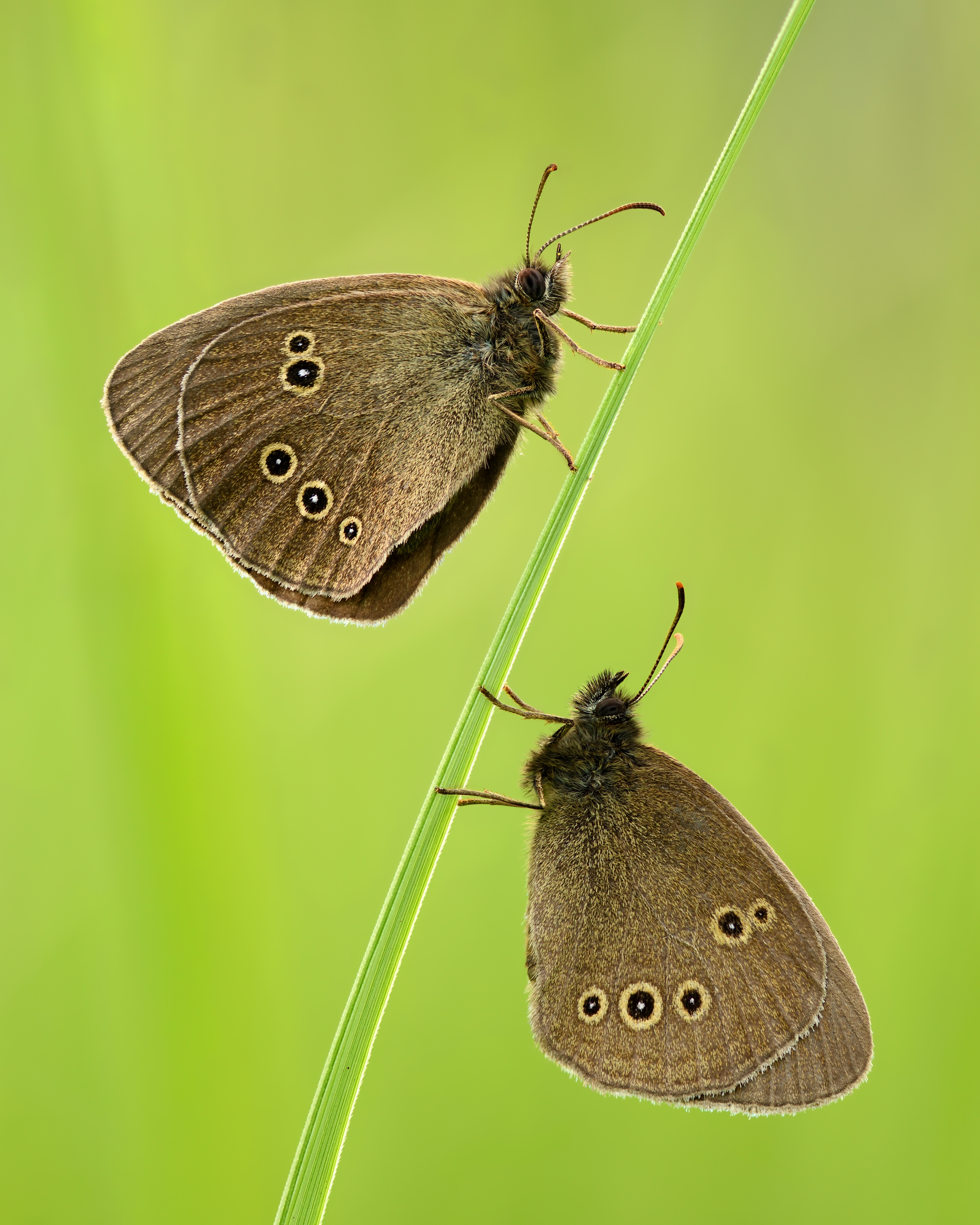
Two ringlets

The ringlet is a widely distributed species found throughout much of the Palearctic realm. In Europe it is common in most countries but absent from northern Scandinavia, peninsular Italy (found in northern Italy), Portugal, southern and central Spain (found in Cantabrian Mountains and the eastern Pyrenees), the Mediterranean islands and North Africa. In Greece it is found in northern regions (Macedonia, Thessaly). Beyond Europe it is found across much of temperate Asia including Russia, Siberia, Mongolia, China and Korea.

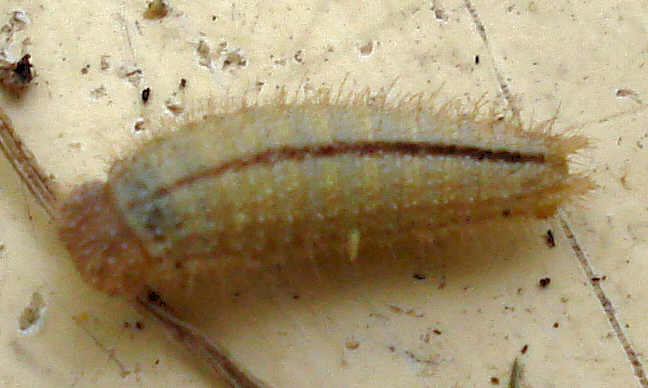
Caterpillar

== Description ==
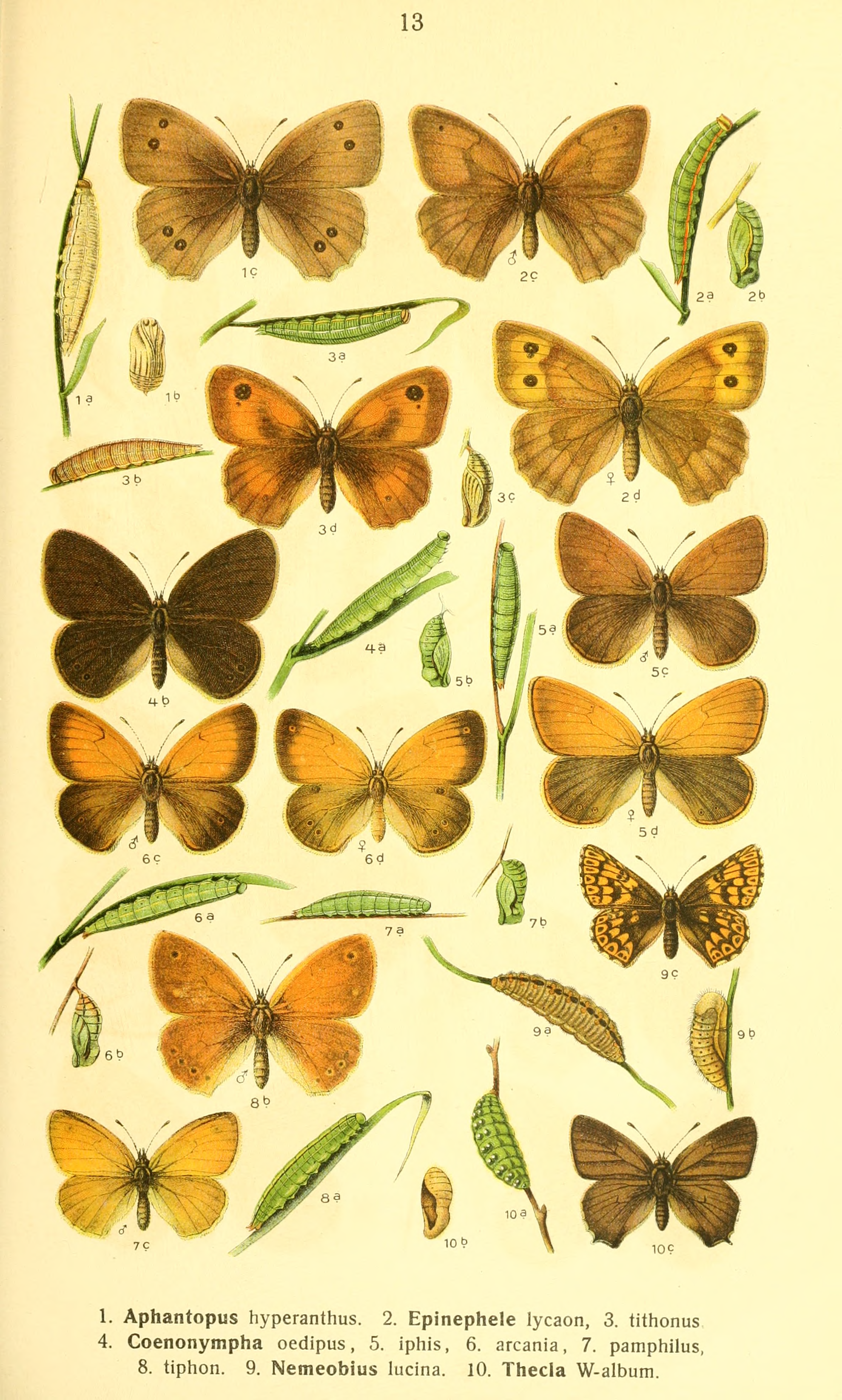
Aphantopus hyperantus and similar species in Karl Eckstein's Die Schmetterlinge Deutschlands

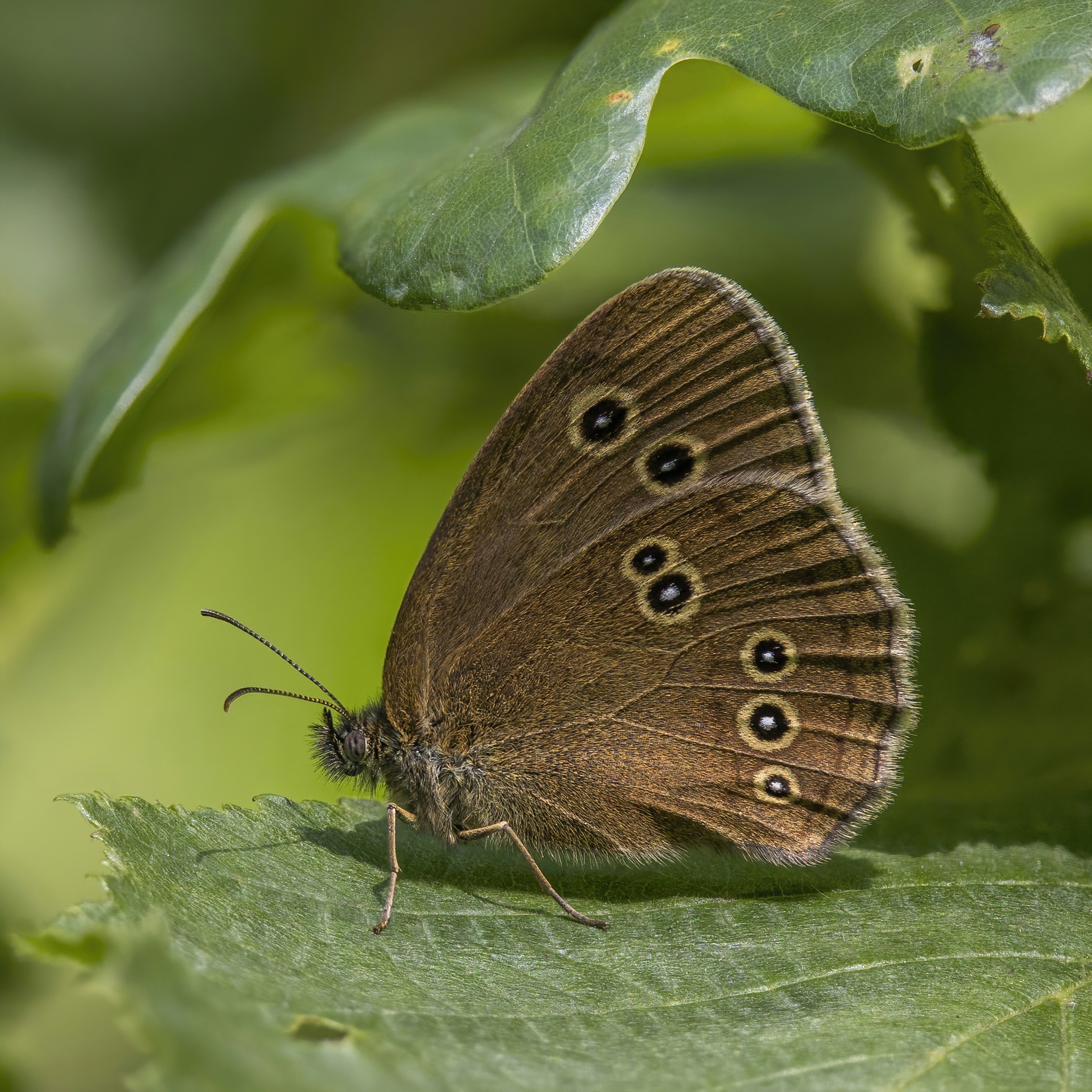
Bernwood Meadows, Oxfordshire

Aphantopus hyperantus is a medium-sized butterfly with a wingspan of up to 35 to 42 millimeters. The wing upper and lower sides are solid brown with small, yellowish-rimmed eyespots. The newly emerged ringlet has a velvety appearance and is almost black with a white fringe to the wings. The number and size of the eyespots is variable, they may be missing on the upper wing surface. In central Europe and southern England the rare form arete occurs. The eggs are pale yellow when first laid, but become pale brown.

The caterpillars are about 25 millimeters long. They are gray or light reddish brown and have dark, reddish brown and very fine dots. Dorsally there is a dark longitudinal line, which is widened at the segment boundaries. Toward the rear, this line is more intensely colored. The head is darker and has several faint longitudinal stripes.

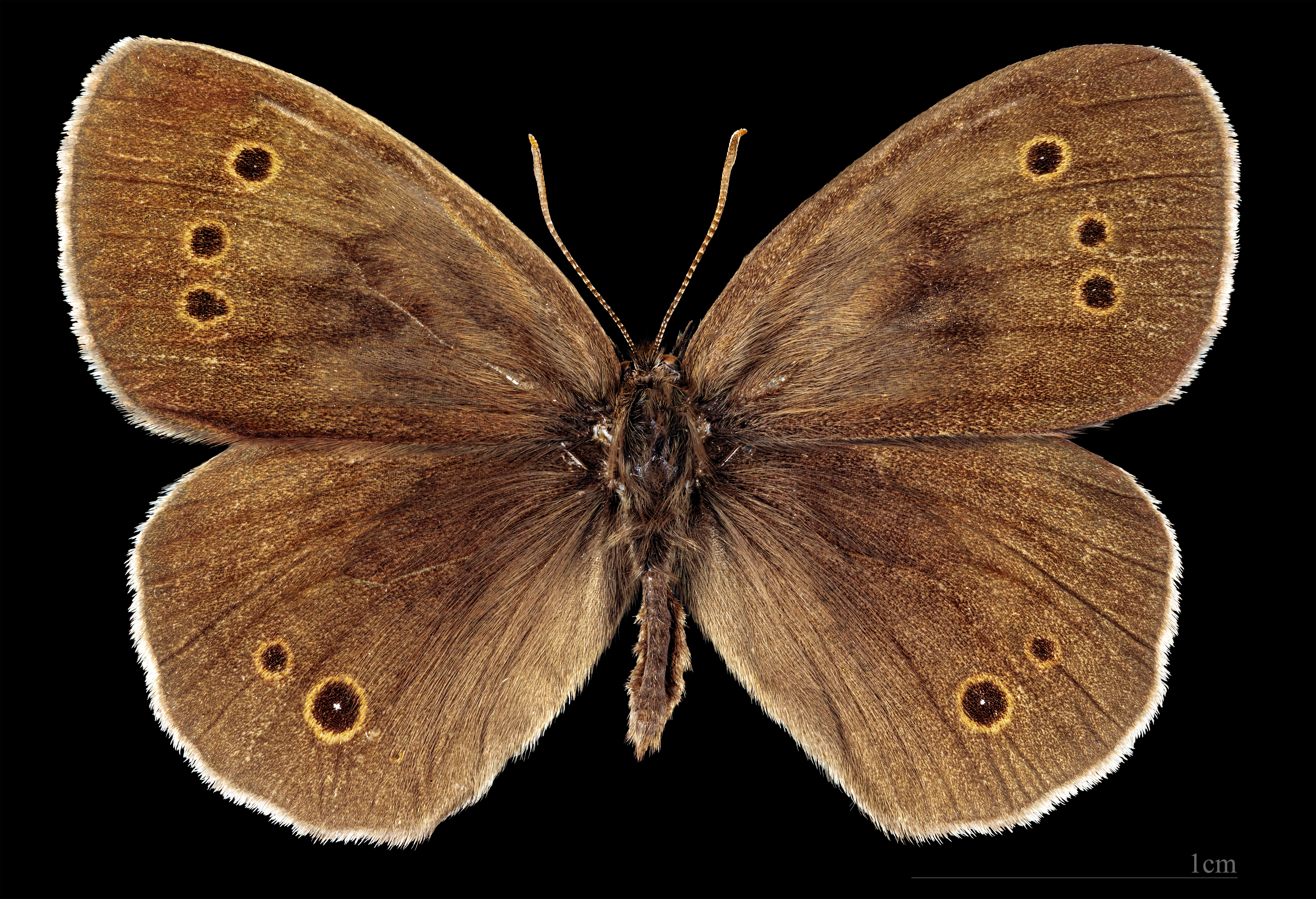
♂

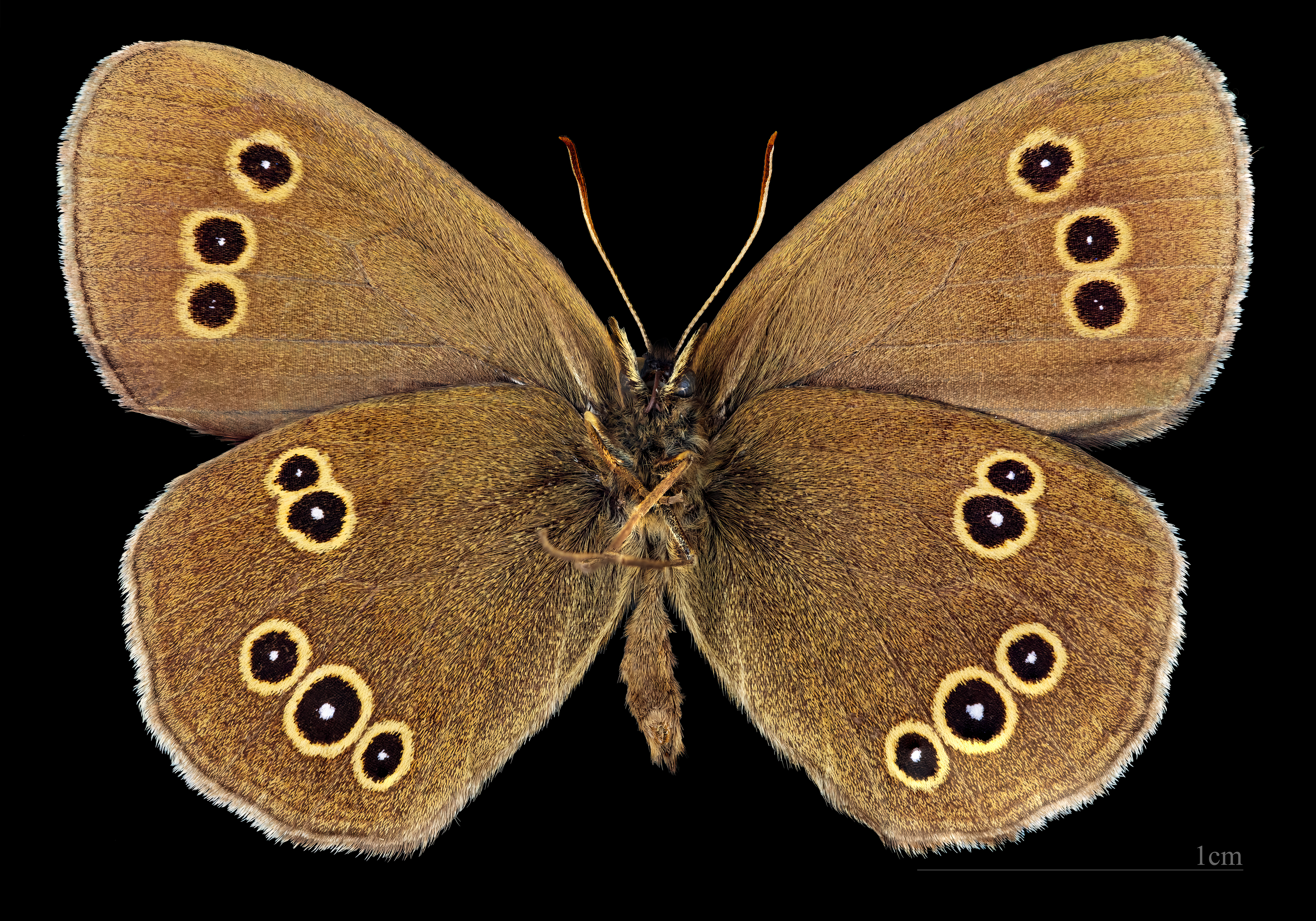
♂ △

=== Color and wing spot variation ===
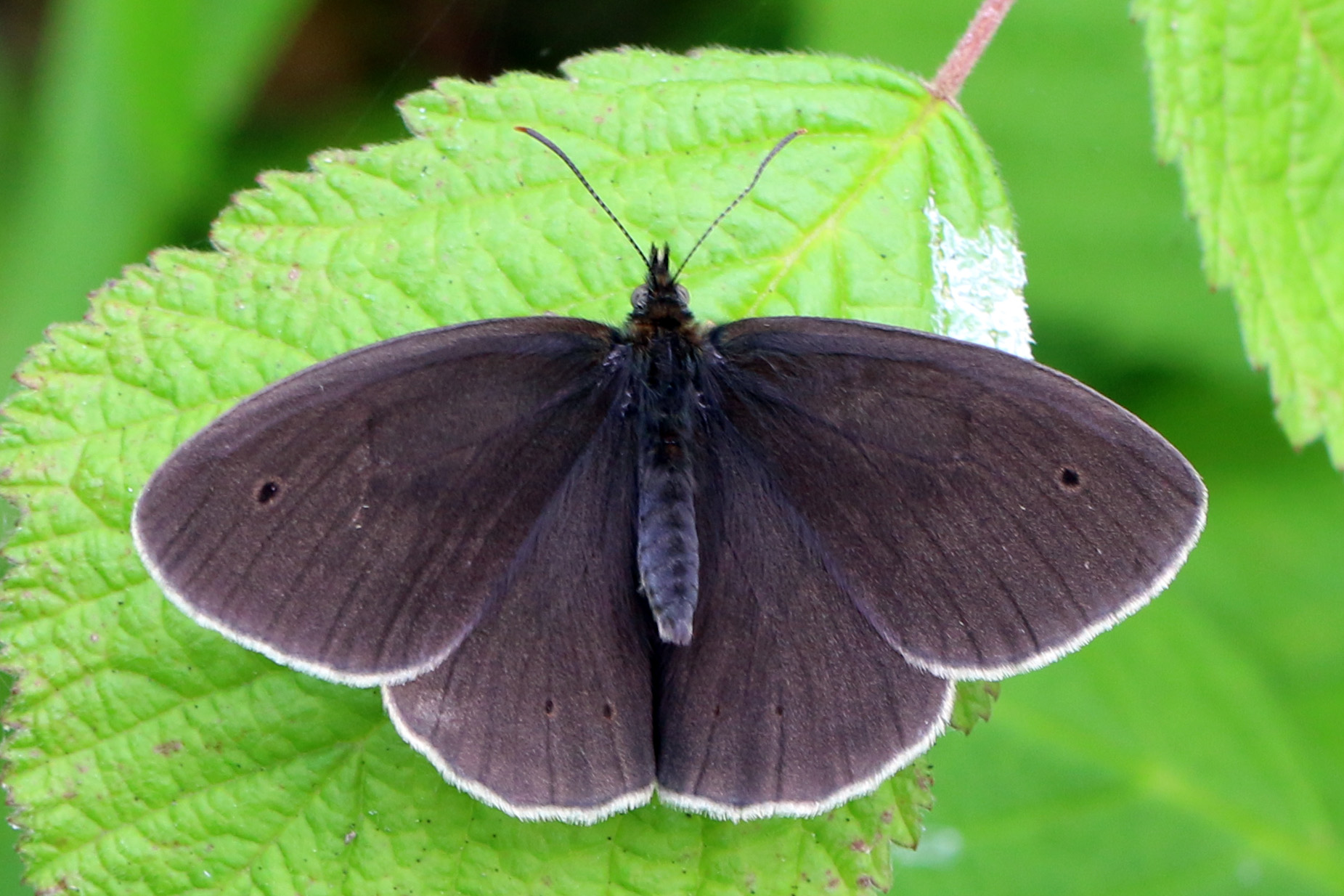
Newly emerged, with one spot

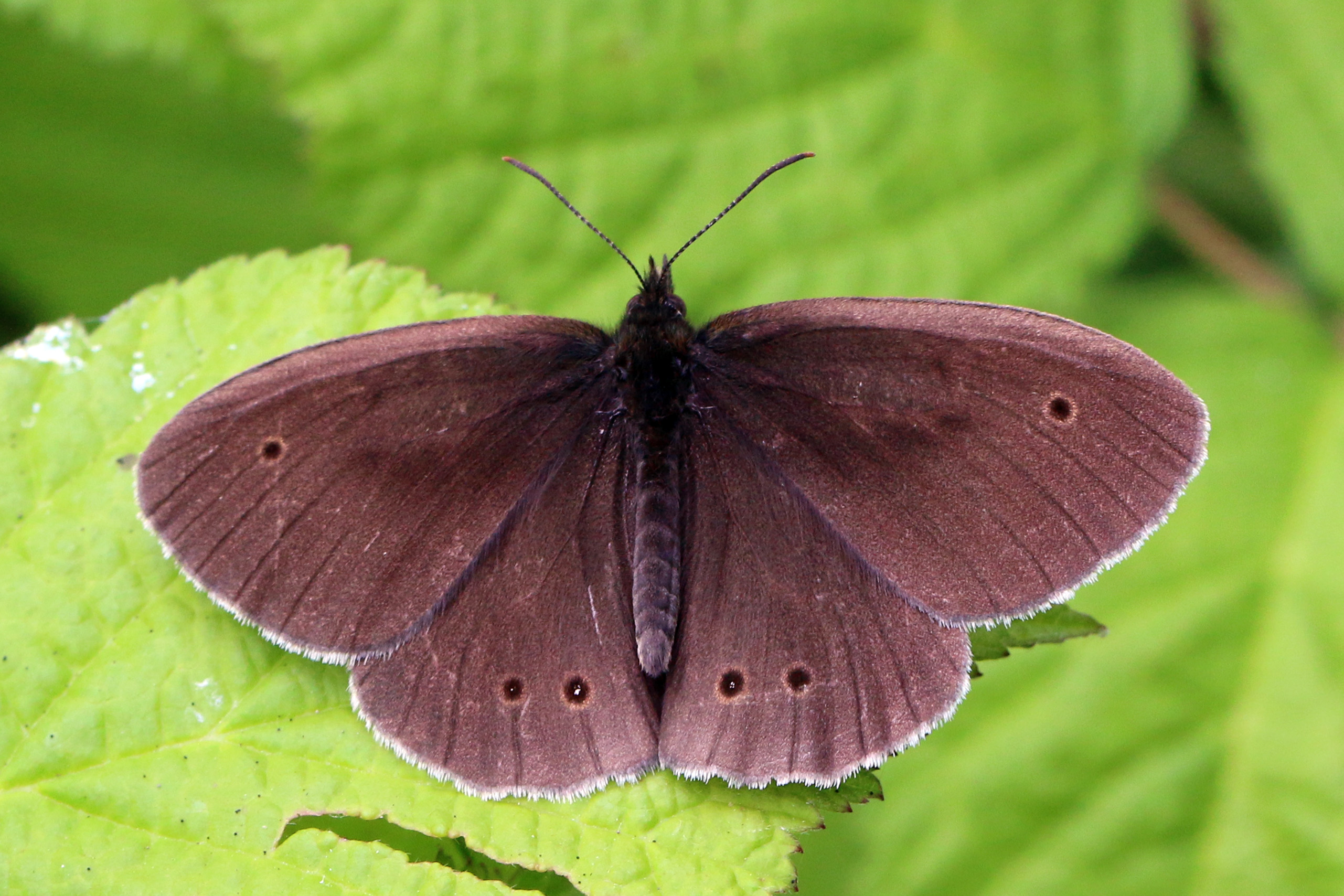
Fresh, with one spot

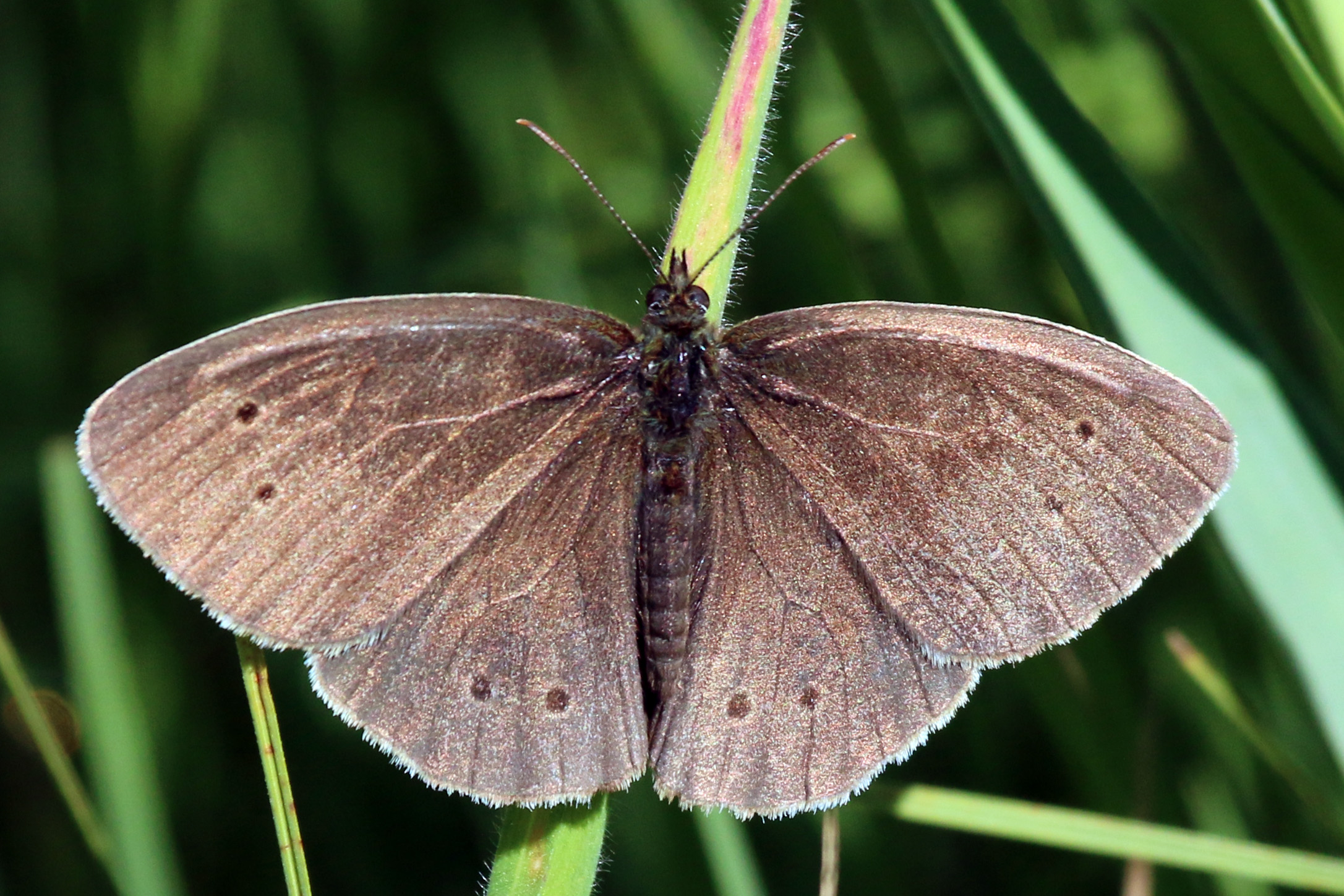
Worn specimen with two spots

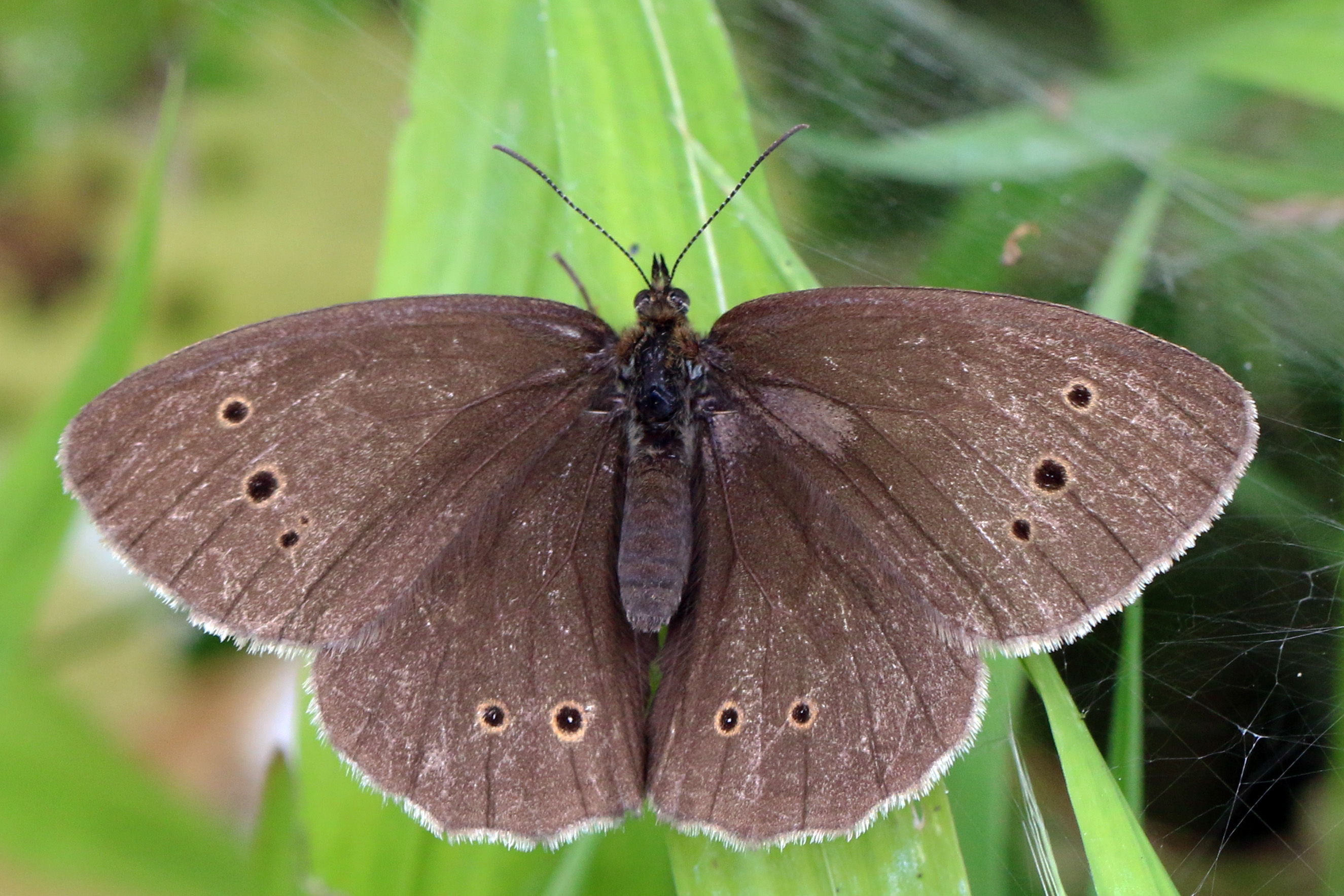
Faded specimen with three spots

== Subspecies ==
- ssp. abaensis Yoshino, 2003 - northwestern Sichuan
- ssp. alpheois Fruhstorfer, 1908 - Ural, western Siberia
- ssp. arctica (Seitz, 1909) - northern Europe
- ssp. bieti (Oberthür, 1884) - Sichuan and northern Yunnan
- ssp. hyperantus Linnaeus, 1758 - western Europe, the type locality is Sweden
- ssp. luti Evans, 1915 - southeastern Tibet
- ssp. ocellata (Butler, 1882) (= amurensis Staudinger, 1892; = insularis Kurentzov, 1966) - Amur and Ussuri
- ssp. sajana (O. Bang-Haas, 1906) - Sayan Mountains
- ssp. sibiricus Obraztsov, 1936 - Altai, southern Siberia and Transbaikalia

== Habitat ==
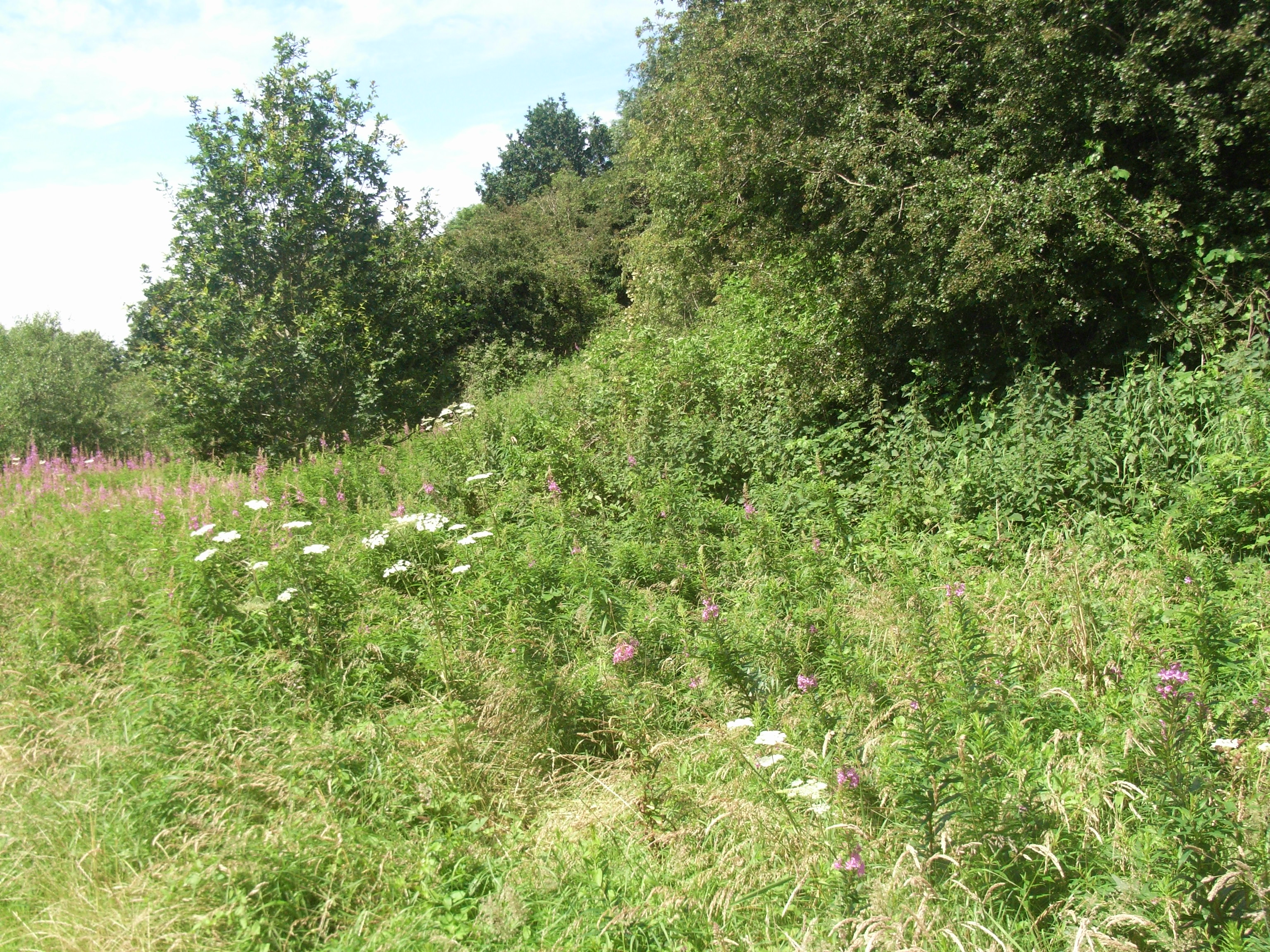
Ringlet habitat

They live in grassy, moist or dry forest clearings with bushes but not in open places. There is a strong degree of attachment to woodland edges and blackberry bushes. The insect can also be very common where there are creeping thistles (Cirsium arvense) or swamp thistles (Cirsium palustre), oregano (Origanum vulgare), forest scabious (Knautia sylvatica), or hogweed (Heracleum sphondylium) which are favorite food plants of the imagos. The males fly in search of newly hatched females in slow, uninterrupted flight and flutter round, about and between grass stems.

== Flight period ==
A single brood butterfly, the imagines fly from mid-June to late August.

== Food of the larva ==
The caterpillars feed on many grasses. Among the food plants are:

- Brachypodium sylvaticum
- Brachypodium pinnatum
- Phleum pratense
- Dactylis glomerata
- Festuca rubra
- Bromus erectus
- Bromus hordeaceus
- Cynosurus cristatus
- Poa pratensis
- Poa nemoralis
- Carex hirta
- Carex strigosa
- Carex sylvatic
- Carex brizoides
- Carex panice
- Agrostis capillaris
- Lilium effusum
- Agropyron repens
- Holcus mollis
- Holcus lanatus
- Deschampsia cespitosa
- Molinia caerulea
- Arrhenatherum elatius
- Calamagrostis epigejos

== Development and biology ==
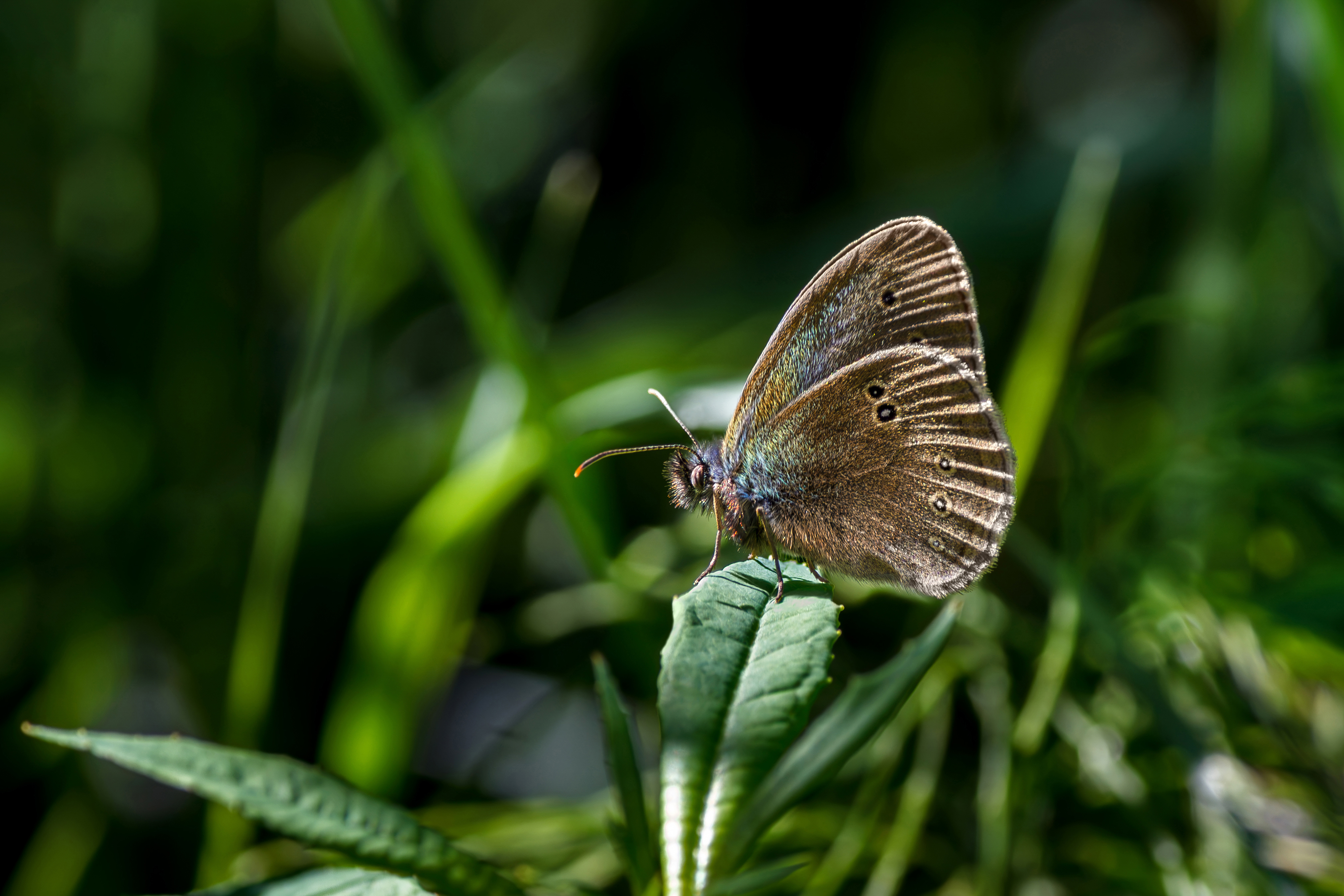
Low sunlight diffracted into an iridescent sheen by the hair-like scales on a ringlet, showing their structure distinctly. Brastad, Sweden.

The female scatters non-adhesive eggs in a slow low flight over grasslands. The larva is nocturnal. There are four moults. The larva hibernates while in the third instar, breaking diapause to feed on warm winter evenings. Feeding resumes in the spring. The pupa stands generally upright in a flimsy silk cocoon, at the base of a grass tussock. This stage lasts for two weeks. A. hyperantus is generally considered to have a closed population structure since it occurs in small, well-defined populations.

== Etymology ==
Hyperantus, of Greek mythology, was one of the 50 sons of Aegyptus, killed by one of the 50 daughters of Danaus.
