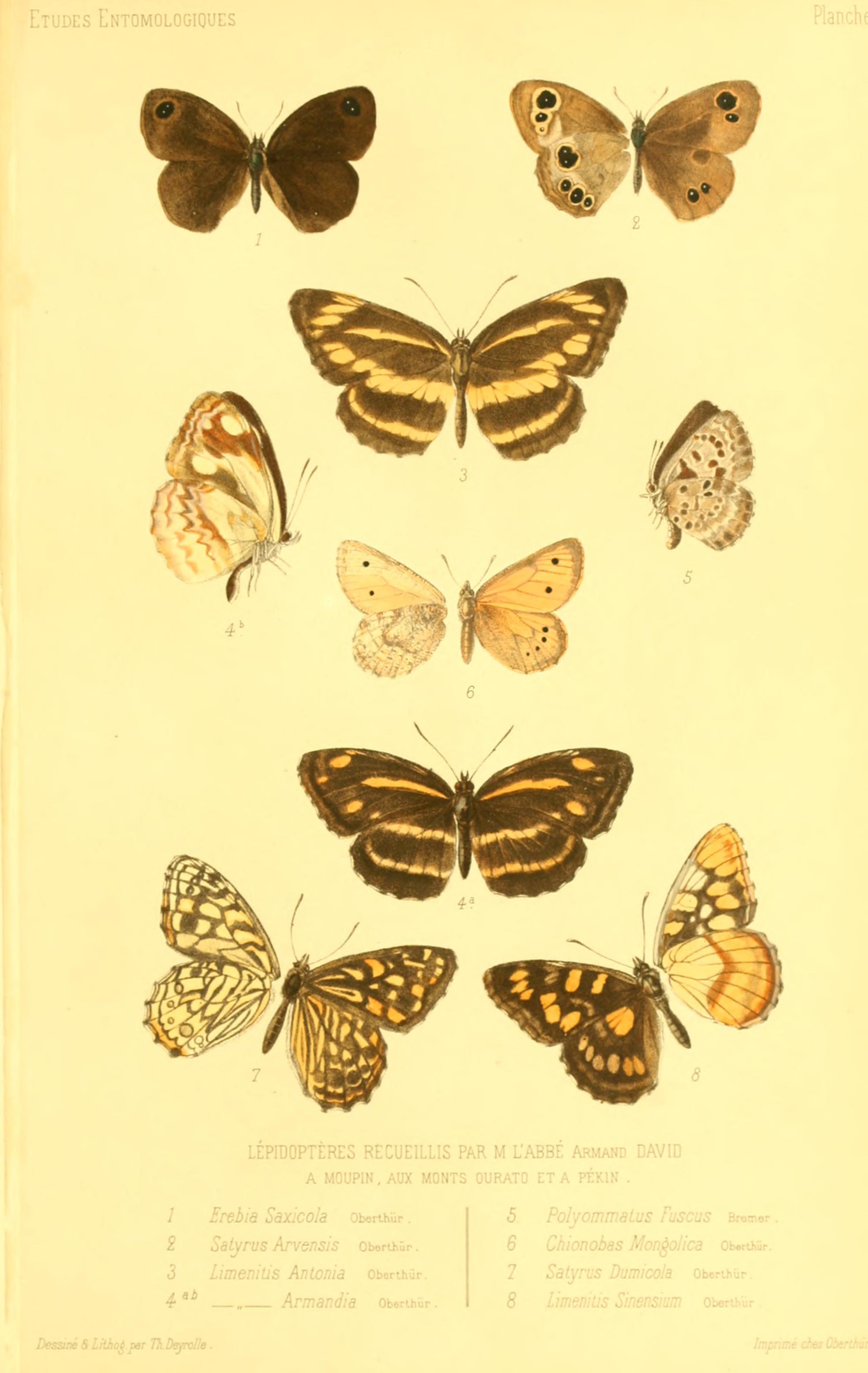
- Aphantopus arvensis in Charles Oberthür's Ètudes d'entomologie: Lépidoptères de Chine

Scientific classification
- Domain: Eukaryota
- Kingdom: Animalia
- Phylum: Arthropoda
- Class: Insecta
- Order: Lepidoptera
- Family: Nymphalidae
- Subfamily: Satyrinae
- Tribe: Satyrini
- Subtribe: Maniolina
- Genus: Aphantopus; Wallengren, 1853

Type species
- Papilio hyperantus Linnaeus, 1758

= Aphantopus =

Genus of butterflies

Aphantopus is a butterfly genus of the Satyrinae. The genus is confined to the Palearctic.

== Species ==
- Aphantopus arvensis (Oberthür, 1876) (western China)
  - Aphantopus arvensis arvensis
  - Aphantopus arvensis campana Leech, 1892 (central China)
  - Aphantopus arvensis deqenensis Li, ?1995
- Aphantopus hyperantus (Linnaeus, 1758) - ringlet
  - Aphantopus hyperantus abaensis Yoshino, 2003
  - Aphantopus hyperantus alpheois Fruhstorfer, 1908 (Siberia)
  - Aphantopus hyperantus arctica (Seitz, 1909) (northern Europe)
  - Aphantopus hyperantus bieti (Oberthür, 1884) (Sichuan, northern Yunnan)
  - Aphantopus hyperantus luti Evans, 1915 (Tibet)
  - Aphantopus hyperantus ocellana (Butler, 1882)
  - Aphantopus hyperantus sajana (O. Bang-Haas, 1906)
  - Aphantopus hyperantus sibiricus Obraztsov, 1936 (Siberia and the Altai Mountains)
- Aphantopus maculosa (Leech, 1890) (China)
