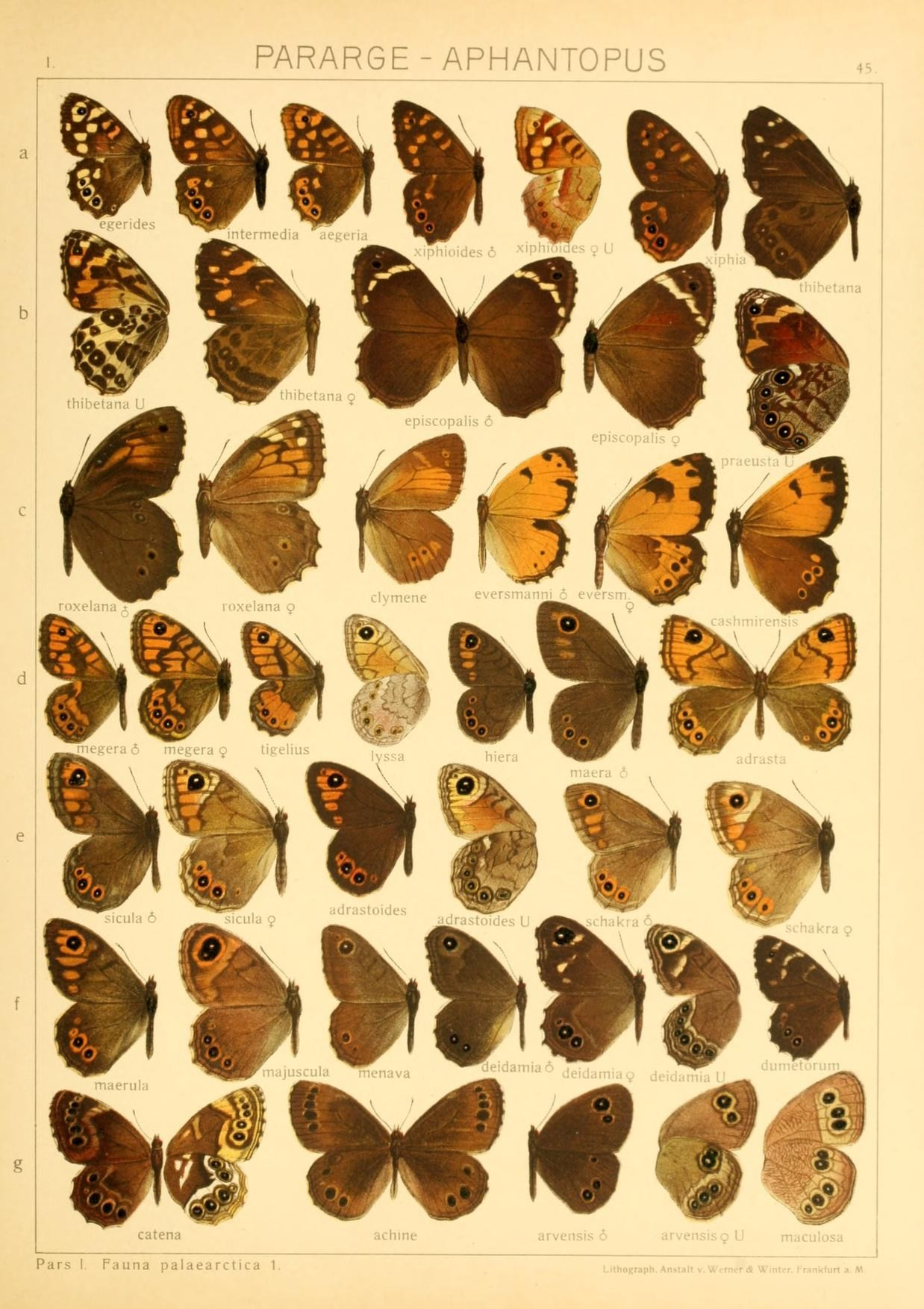
- Aphantopus maculosa in Seitz (45g)

Scientific classification
- Domain: Eukaryota
- Kingdom: Animalia
- Phylum: Arthropoda
- Class: Insecta
- Order: Lepidoptera
- Family: Nymphalidae
- Genus: Aphantopus
- Species: A. maculosa

Binomial name
- Aphantopus maculosa Leech, 1890

= Aphantopus maculosa =

Species of butterfly

Aphantopus maculosa is a butterfly found in the Palearctic that belongs to the browns family. It is endemic to China.

== Description from Seitz ==
A. maculosa Leech (45 g). Forewing above and beneath with 3 eye -rings; hindwing above with 2, beneath with 5 eye-rings; all the ocelli without ocelli above. — Chang-Yang, singly, in July.
