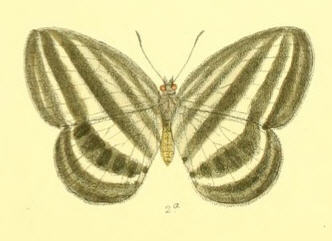
- Ragadia crito upperside
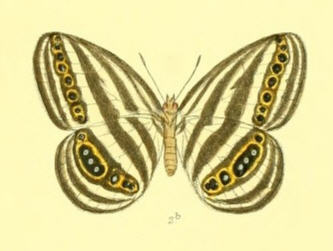
- Ragadia crito underside

Scientific classification
- Kingdom: Animalia
- Phylum: Arthropoda
- Class: Insecta
- Order: Lepidoptera
- Family: Nymphalidae
- Tribe: Ragadiini
- Genus: Ragadia; Westwood 1851

Species
- Several, see text

= Ragadia =

Genus of butterflies

Ragadia is a genus of brush-footed butterflies (family Nymphalidae). This genus is one of those commonly called ringlets.

== Species ==
- Ragadia annulata
- Ragadia crisilda - striped ringlet
- Ragadia critias
- Ragadia crito
- Ragadia critolaus
- Ragadia crohonica
- Ragadia luzonia
- Ragadia maganda
- Ragadia makuta
- Ragadia melindena
