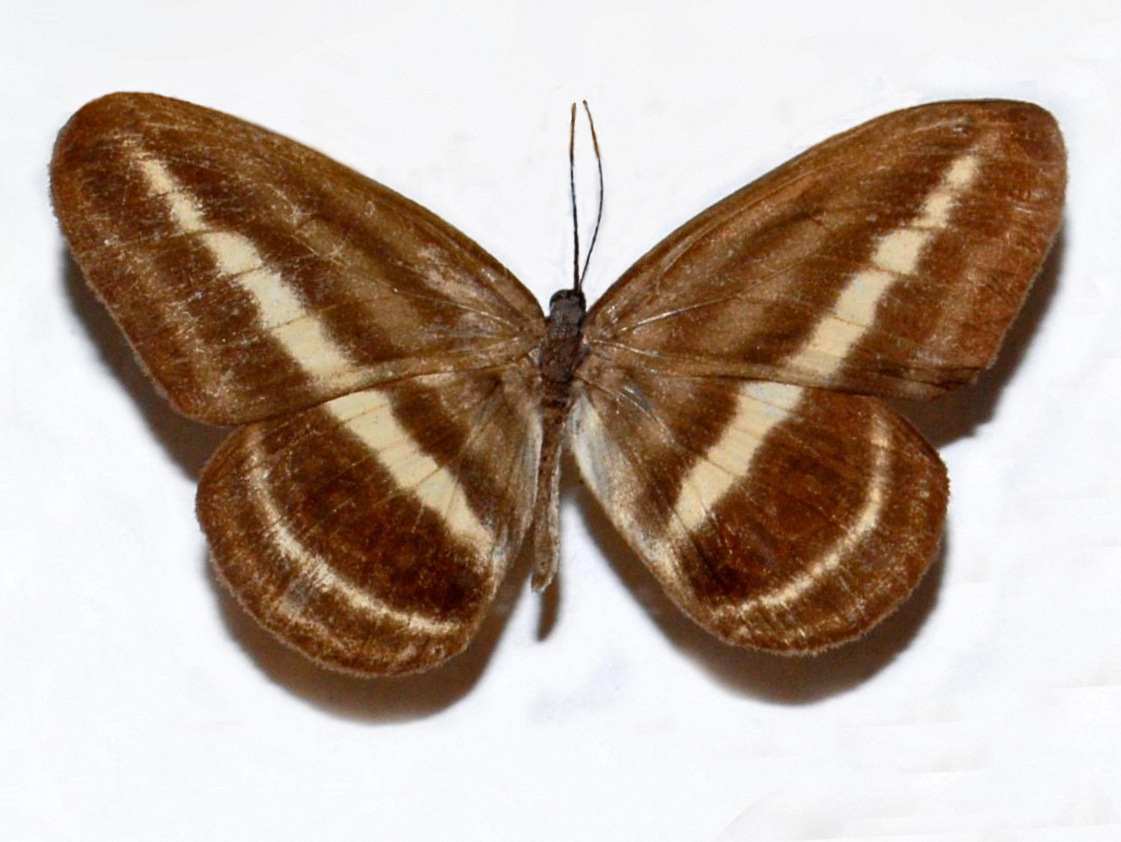
- Upperside
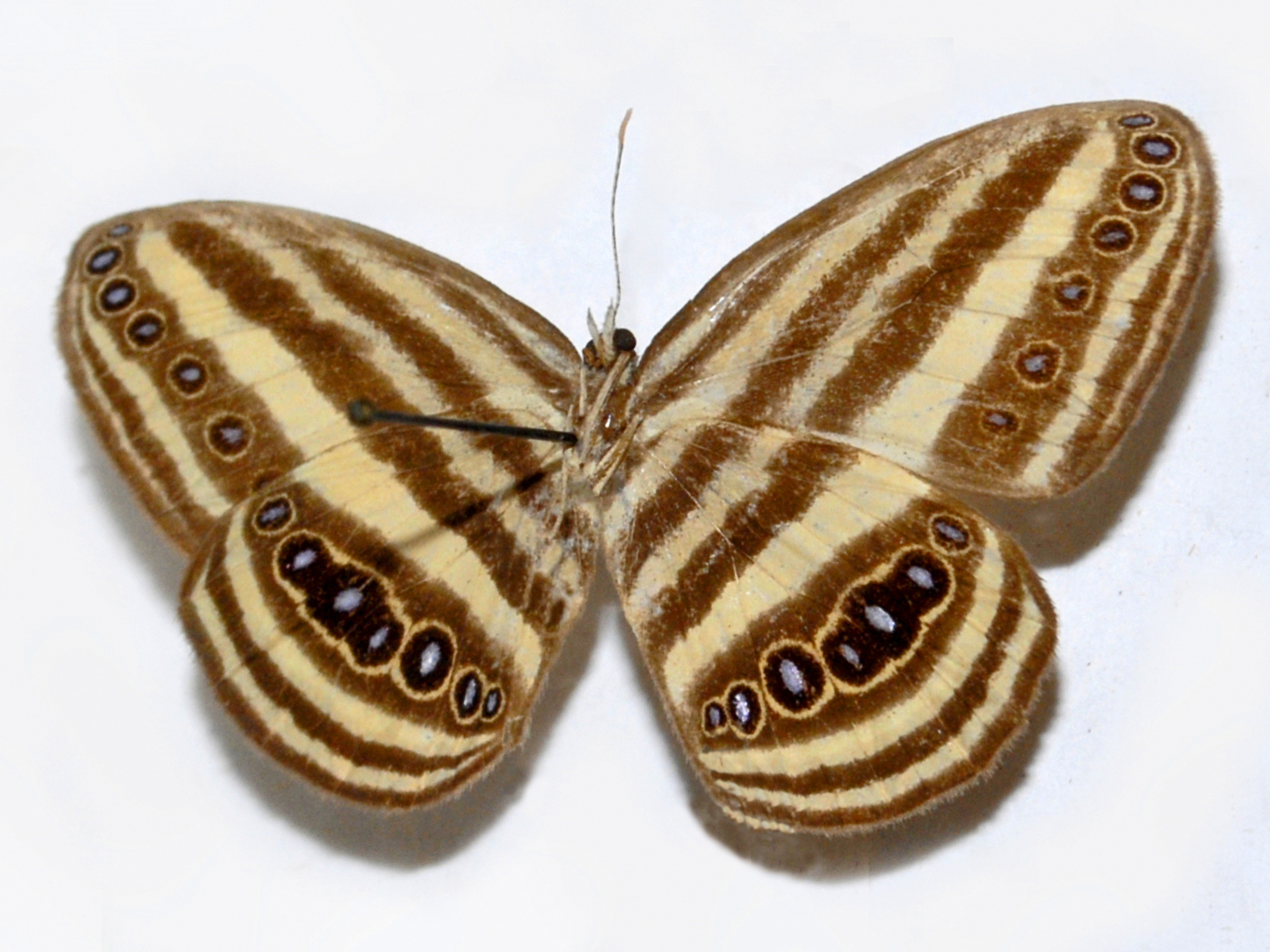
- Underside

Scientific classification
- Domain: Eukaryota
- Kingdom: Animalia
- Phylum: Arthropoda
- Class: Insecta
- Order: Lepidoptera
- Family: Nymphalidae
- Genus: Ragadia
- Species: R. crisilda

Binomial name
- Ragadia crisilda Hewitson, 1862

Synonyms
- Ragadia latifasciata Leech, 1891; Ragadia critolaus de Nicéville, [1893]

= Ragadia crisilda =

Species of butterfly

Ragadia crisilda, the striped ringlet, is a species of brush-footed butterflies (family Nymphalidae).

== Subspecies ==
- Ragadia crisilda crisilda - Assam, Burma, Thailand, Indochina
- Ragadia crisilda critolina Evans, 1923 - Peninsular Malaya
- Ragadia crisilda crisildina Joicey & Talbot, 1921 - Hainan
- Ragadia crisilda latifasciata Leech, 1891 - western China
- Ragadia crisilda critolaus de Nicéville, 1893 - southern Burma (Tenasserim), Thailand, Laos, Vietnam

== Description ==
Wingspan can reach 35–45 millimetres (1.4–1.8 in). In both males and females, the upperside of the wings is basically dusky black, with both forewings and hindwings crossed by a white discal band. Hindwings show also a curved narrow postdiscal white band. The underside of the forewings and hindwings is crossed by five white bands. Across the discal and post discal bands is present a row of black, yellow ringed ocelli, with silvery-blue centres. Forewings bear eight ocelli, while hindwings show seven ocelli.
