= List of animals referred to as girdled =

Girdled identifies various animal species:

== Girdled lizards ==
Lizards from the genus Cordylus.

- Angolan girdled lizard (Cordylus angolensis), also known as the Angolan spiny-tailed lizard
- Black girdled lizard (Cordylus niger), restricted to Table Mountain on the Cape Peninsula and a population near Langebaan
- Cape Girdled Lizard (Cordylus cordylus), indigenous to the southern Cape region of South Africa
- Dwarf Karoo girdled lizard (Cordylus aridus), a species of lizard in the family Cordylidae
- Giant girdled lizard (Cordylus giganteus), the sungazer, giant spiny-tailed lizard, giant zonure, the largest species of girdled lizard
- Lawrence's girdled lizard (Cordylus lawrenci), a species of lizard in the family Cordylidae
- Limpopo girdled lizard (Cordylus jonesii) live along South Africa's border with Botswana, Zimbabwe, and Mozambique
- Machadoe's girdled lizard (Cordylus machadoi), a flattened girdled lizard from northwestern Namibia
- Mclachlan's girdled lizard (Cordylus mclachlani) is a species of lizard in the family Cordylidae
- Mozambique girdled lizard (Cordylus mossambicus), a large, flattened girdled lizard found in the Gorongosa Mountains in Mozambique
- Rhodesian girdled lizard (Cordylus rhodesianus), exported from Mozambique for the pet trade
- Transvaal girdled lizard (Cordylus vittifer), a very flattened girdled lizard from northeastern South Africa, Swaziland, and southeastern Botswana
- Ukinga girdled lizard (Cordylus ukingensis), a poorly known species of girdled lizard from central Tanzania
- Warren's girdled lizard (Cordylus warreni), a relatively large flattened lizard from the Lebombo Mountains in northeastern South Africa and eastern Swaziland

== Other lizards ==
- Armadillo girdled lizard (Ouroborus cataphractus), a species of lizard in the family Cordylidae
- Blue-spotted girdled lizard (Ninurta coeruleopunctatus), endemic to southern, coastal South Africa
- Madagascar girdled lizard or Madagascar plated lizard (Zonosaurus madagascariensis), a species of lizard in the family Gerrhosauridae
- Prickly girdled lizard or spiny crag lizard (Pseudocordylus spinosus), a species of lizard in the family Cordylidae
- Zoutpansberg girdled lizard (Smaug depressus), a species of lizard in the family Cordylidae

== Other animals ==
- Blue girdled angelfish (Pomacanthus navarchus), a marine angelfish from the Indo-Pacific region
- Black-girdled barbet (Capito dayi), a bird in the family Ramphastidae, found in Bolivia and Brazil
- Girdled Cardinalfish (Taeniamia zosterophora), native to the western Pacific Ocean from Indonesia to Vanuatu and from the Ryukyus to Australia
- Girdled wrasse (Notolabrus cinctus), a fish of the genus Notolabrus, found around the South Island of New Zealand

== See also ==
- Girdle
- Girdling
- Girdled grapes
