= Cordylus beraduccii =

Conservation status
- Least Concern (IUCN 3.1)

Scientific classification
- Kingdom: Animalia
- Phylum: Chordata
- Class: Reptilia
- Order: Squamata
- Family: Cordylidae
- Genus: Cordylus
- Species: C. beraduccii

Binomial name
- Cordylus beraduccii Broadley & Branch, 2002

Species of lizard

Cordylus beraduccii, also known commonly as the Maasai girdled lizard, is a species of girdled lizard in the family Cordylidae. The species is native to East Africa.

== Geographic range ==
C. beraduccii is found in Kenya and Tanzania, where it lives in the Maasai plains from the Ngong Hills to Dodoma.

== Habitat ==
The Maasai girdled lizard is a rock-dwelling species that tends to prefer rock outcroppings in savannas or temperate forests.

== Reproduction ==
The Maasai girdled lizard reproduces both sexually and asexually. It is an ovoviviparous species, meaning that the female parent produces eggs that hatch in the body, resulting in a live birth. Usually 1-5 young are born.

== Captivity ==
Because of the Maasai girdled lizard's timid behavior and ability to easily reproduce asexually in captivity, it is quite common in the pet trade. It is the second most common girdled lizard bred in captivity behind the East African spiny-tailed lizard (Cordylus tropidosternum), and both species tend to fall under the same name of armadillo lizard, though unlike the real species of that name (Ouroborus cataphractus), this species does not grasp its tail and form a ball for defense.

== Taxonomy ==
The species C. beraduccii was described in 2002 by Donald G. Broadley and William R. "Bill" Branch, who named the species after the collector of the type specimen, Joe Beraducci.
