= Ukinga girdled lizard =

Conservation status
- Data Deficient (IUCN 3.1)

Scientific classification
- Kingdom: Animalia
- Phylum: Chordata
- Class: Reptilia
- Order: Squamata
- Suborder: Scinciformata
- Infraorder: Scincomorpha
- Family: Cordylidae
- Genus: Cordylus
- Species: C. ukingensis

Binomial name
- Cordylus ukingensis (Loveridge, 1932)

Species of lizard

The Ukinga girdled lizard (Cordylus ukingensis) is a poorly known species of girdled lizard from central Tanzania. They are rupicolous (rock-dwelling) and feed on small arthropods.

The dorsal coloration is red-brown with scattered dark mottles. The lateral scales often have pale borders. The upper lip is white and there is a distinct dark dorsolateral band on the sides of the neck. The belly is pale gray. The maximum length is around 170 mm.

The Ukinga girdled lizard can be distinguished from related species (Cordylus tropidosternum and Cordylus jonesii) by their white lips, keeled scales on the throat, fusion of the loreal scale with the preocular (separate in other species), and the presence of a low supraocular ridge. The supraocular ridge extends along the lateral edges of the prefrontal, frontal, frontoparietal, parietal, and supraocular scales.

Ukinga girdled lizards have recently been exported from Tanzania for the pet trade. They are commonly labeled, along with the tropical girdled lizard, as the armadillo lizard.
