= Cordylus marunguensis =

Conservation status
- Endangered (IUCN 3.1)

Scientific classification
- Kingdom: Animalia
- Phylum: Chordata
- Class: Reptilia
- Order: Squamata
- Family: Cordylidae
- Genus: Cordylus
- Species: C. marunguensis

Binomial name
- Cordylus marunguensis Greenbaum, Stanley, Kusamba, Moninga, Goldberg, & Bursey, 2012

Species of lizard

Cordylus marunguensis, the Marungu girdled lizard, is a species of lizard in the family Cordylidae. It is a small, spiny lizard found in the Democratic Republic of the Congo.
