= Cordylus rivae =

Ethiopian girdled lizard

Conservation status
- Data Deficient (IUCN 3.1)

Scientific classification
- Kingdom: Animalia
- Phylum: Chordata
- Class: Reptilia
- Order: Squamata
- Suborder: Scinciformata
- Infraorder: Scincomorpha
- Family: Cordylidae
- Genus: Cordylus
- Species: C. rivae

Binomial name
- Cordylus rivae (Boulenger, 1896)

Species of lizard

Cordylus rivae, the Ethiopian girdled lizard, is a species of lizard in the family Cordylidae. It is a small, spiny lizard found in Ethiopia.
