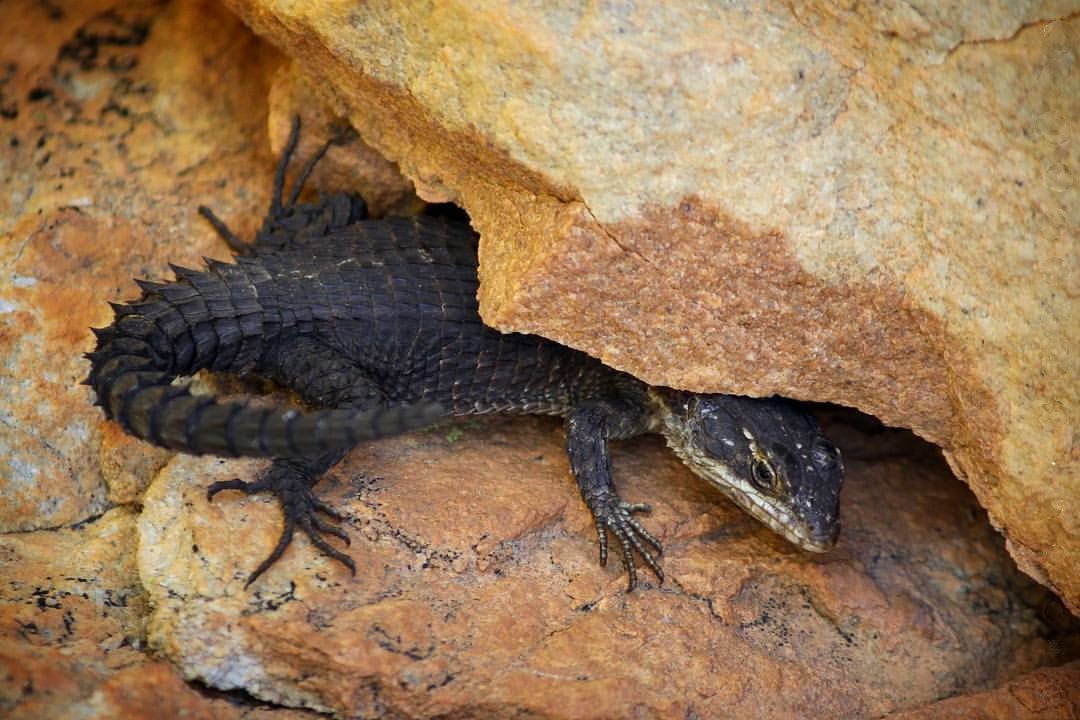

Conservation status
- Least Concern (IUCN 3.1)

Scientific classification
- Kingdom: Animalia
- Phylum: Chordata
- Class: Reptilia
- Order: Squamata
- Family: Cordylidae
- Genus: Cordylus
- Species: C. oelofseni

Binomial name
- Cordylus oelofseni Mouton & Van Wyk, 1990

= Cordylus oelofseni =

Species of lizard

Cordylus oelofseni, also known commonly as Oelofsen's girdled lizard and the western dwarf girdled lizard, is a species of lizard in the family Cordylidae. It is a small, spiny lizard endemic to South Africa.

== Etymology ==
The specific name, oelofseni, is in honor of African zoologist Burger W. Oelofsen.

== Description ==
Adults of Cordylus oelofseni usually have a snout-to-vent length (SVL) of 5.5–6.5 cm (2.2–2.6 in). Dorsally, it is black, with a pale gray vertebral line, which may be interrupted. Ventrally, it is dark gray.

== Geographic distribution ==
Cordylus oelofseni is found in Western Cape province, South Africa.

== Habitat ==
The preferred natural habitat of Cordylus oelofseni is rocky areas of shrubland, at elevations above 300 m (980 ft).

== Behavior ==
Cordylus oelofseni is terrestrial and saxicolous (rock-dwelling).

== Reproduction ==
Cordylus oelofseni is ovoviviparous. Litter size is two to three young.
