= Cordylus phonolithos =

Conservation status
- Least Concern (IUCN 3.1)

Scientific classification
- Kingdom: Animalia
- Phylum: Chordata
- Class: Reptilia
- Order: Squamata
- Suborder: Scinciformata
- Infraorder: Scincomorpha
- Family: Cordylidae
- Genus: Cordylus
- Species: C. phonolithos

Binomial name
- Cordylus phonolithos Marques, Ceríaco, Stanley, Bandeira, Agarwal, & Bauer, 2019

Species of lizard

Cordylus phonolithos, commonly known as the N'Dolondolo girdled lizard, is a species of lizard in the family Cordylidae. It is a small, spiny lizard found in Angola.
