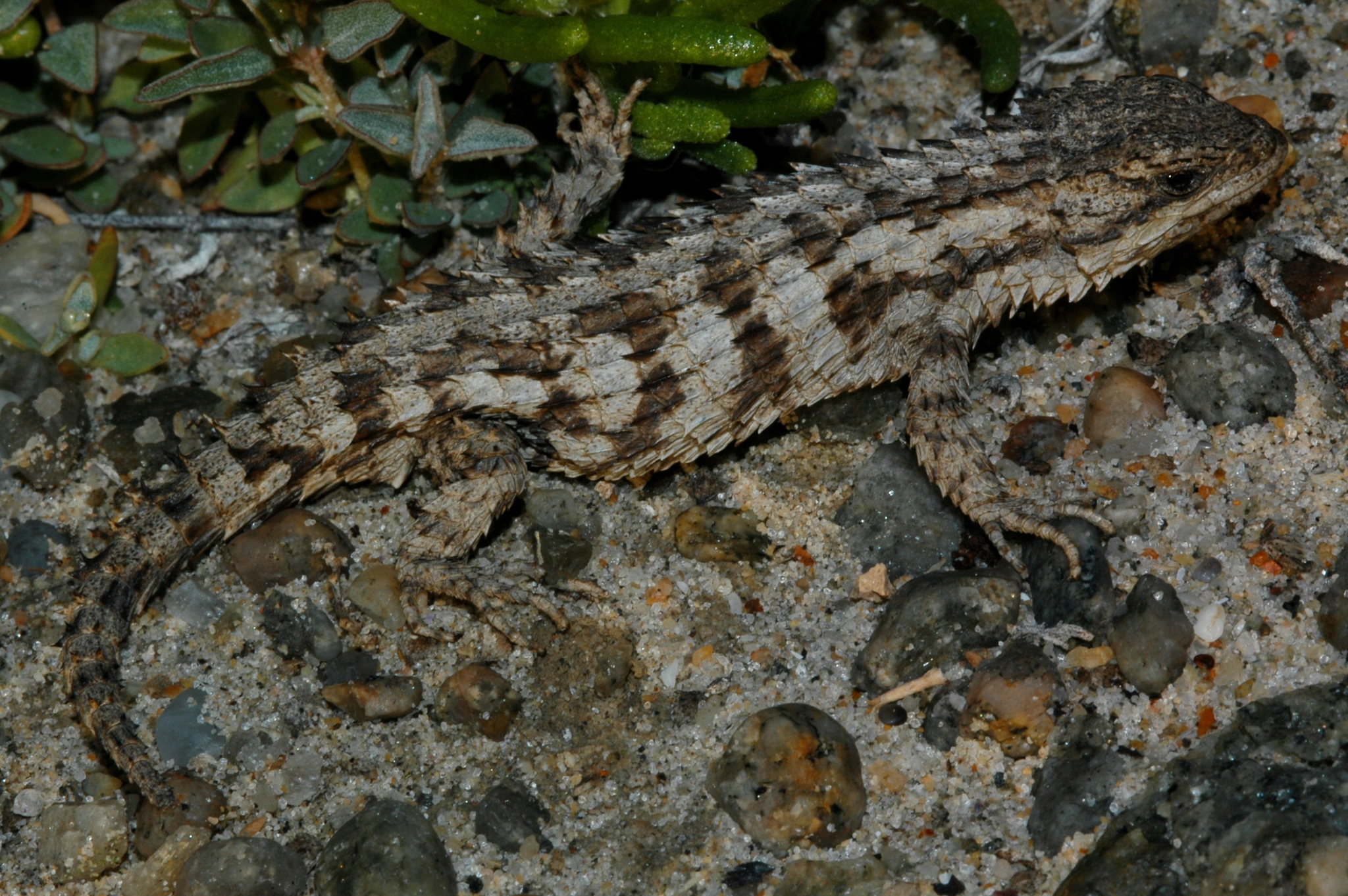

Conservation status
- Near Threatened (IUCN 3.1)

Scientific classification
- Kingdom: Animalia
- Phylum: Chordata
- Class: Reptilia
- Order: Squamata
- Family: Cordylidae
- Genus: Cordylus
- Species: C. macropholis

Binomial name
- Cordylus macropholis (Boulenger, 1910)

= Cordylus macropholis =

Species of lizard

Cordylus macropholis, the large-scaled girdled lizard, is a small (55-77 mm) lizard endemic to the west coast of South Africa. They spend most of their time on and around a single plant species, Euphorbia caput-medusae which only occupies around 5% of the vegetation present. It is thought that they restrict themselves to these plants because they provide safer hiding places than most other shrubs, house a large range of invertebrate prey, and provide good thermal microhabitats. They can additionally be found sunbathing on, or hiding in between rocks, as these could provide protection from larger predators from which their physical adaptations might not provided them with adequate protection.
