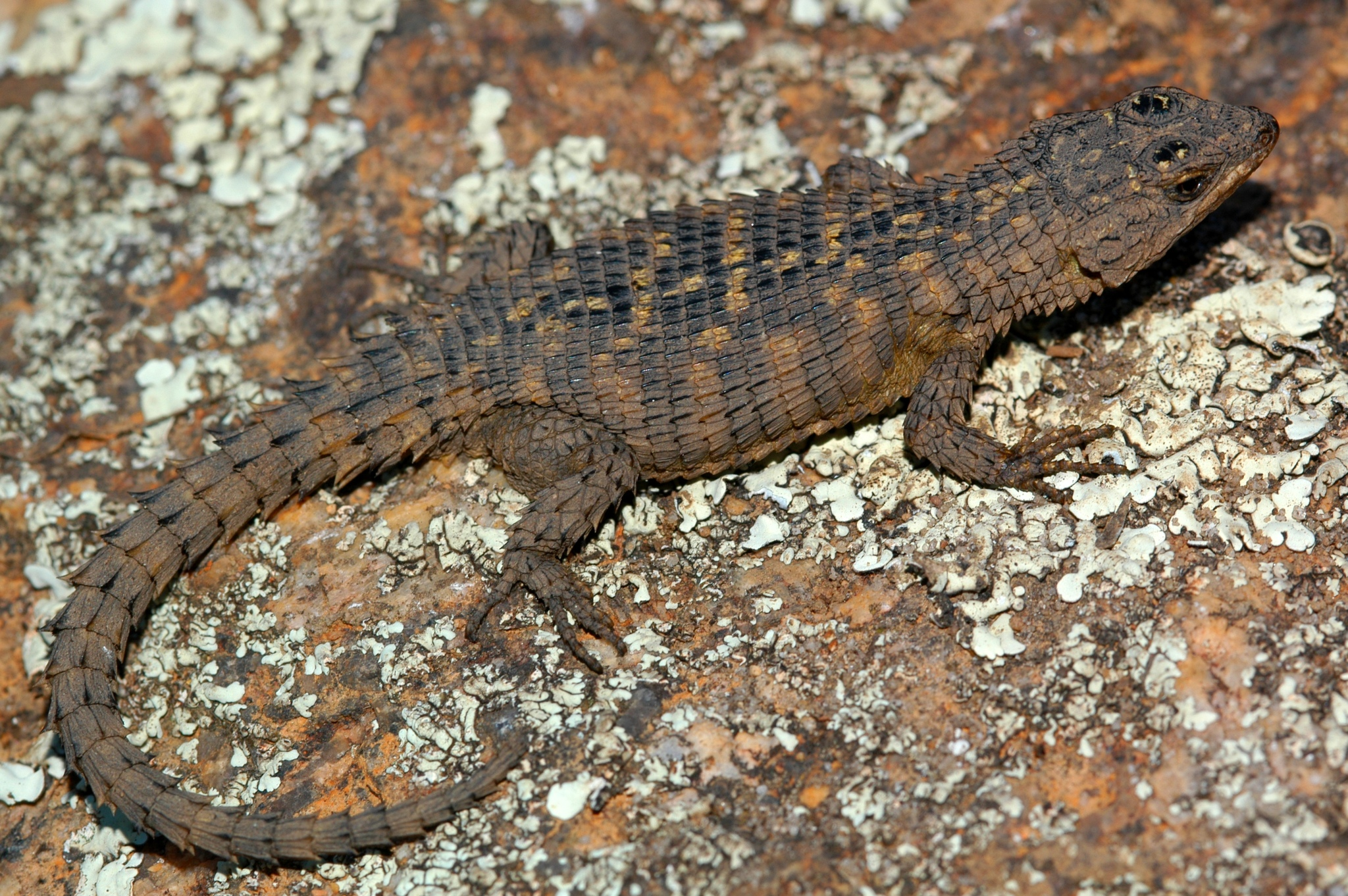

Conservation status
- Least Concern (IUCN 3.1)

Scientific classification
- Kingdom: Animalia
- Phylum: Chordata
- Class: Reptilia
- Order: Squamata
- Family: Cordylidae
- Genus: Cordylus
- Species: C. imkeae

Binomial name
- Cordylus imkeae Mouton & Van Wyk, 1994

= Rooiberg girdled lizard =

Species of lizard

The Rooiberg girdled lizard (Cordylus imkeae) is a species of small, spiny lizard in the family Cordylidae. The species is endemic to South Africa.

== Etymology ==
The specific name, imkeae, is in honor of German biologist Imke Cordes.

== Geographic range ==
C. imkeae is found in Namaqualand, Northern Cape Province, South Africa.

== Habitat ==
The preferred natural habitat of C. imkei is rocky areas of shrubland.

== Description ==
Adults of C. imkeae usually have a snout-to-vent length (SVL) of 4.0–6.5 cm (1.6–2.6 in).

== Reproduction ==
C. imkei is ovoviviparous.
