= Cordylus namakuiyus =

Conservation status
- Least Concern (IUCN 3.1)

Scientific classification
- Kingdom: Animalia
- Phylum: Chordata
- Class: Reptilia
- Order: Squamata
- Suborder: Scinciformata
- Infraorder: Scincomorpha
- Family: Cordylidae
- Genus: Cordylus
- Species: C. namakuiyus

Binomial name
- Cordylus namakuiyus Stanley, Ceríaco, Bandeira, Valerio, Bates, & Branch, 2016

Species of lizard

Cordylus namakuiyus, the Kaokoveld girdled lizard, is a species of lizard in the family Cordylidae. It is a small, spiny lizard found in Angola.
