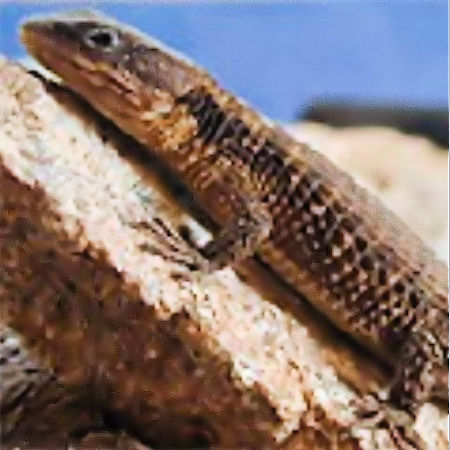

Conservation status
- Data Deficient (IUCN 3.1)

Scientific classification
- Kingdom: Animalia
- Phylum: Chordata
- Class: Reptilia
- Order: Squamata
- Suborder: Scinciformata
- Infraorder: Scincomorpha
- Family: Cordylidae
- Genus: Cordylus
- Species: C. angolensis

Binomial name
- Cordylus angolensis (Bocage, 1895)

Synonyms
- Zonurus angolensis Bocage, 1895; Cordylus cordylus angolensis — Loveridge, 1944; Cordylus angolensis — Visser, 1971

= Angolan girdled lizard =

Species of lizard

The Angolan girdled lizard (Cordylus angolensis), also known as the Angolan spiny-tailed lizard, is a species of lizard in the genus Cordylus. The species is endemic to Angola, as its names testify, and is ovoviviparous.

== Reproduction ==
C. angolensis is ovoviviparous, meaning females keep eggs inside their bodies until ready to hatch.
