= Cordylus minor =

Western dwarf girdled lizard

Conservation status
- Least Concern (IUCN 3.1)

Scientific classification
- Kingdom: Animalia
- Phylum: Chordata
- Class: Reptilia
- Order: Squamata
- Suborder: Scinciformata
- Infraorder: Scincomorpha
- Family: Cordylidae
- Genus: Cordylus
- Species: C. minor

Binomial name
- Cordylus minor FitzSimons, 1943

Species of lizard

The western dwarf girdled lizard (Cordylus minor) is a species of lizard in the family Cordylidae. It is a small, spiny lizard found in South Africa.
