= Machadoe's girdled lizard =

Conservation status
- Near Threatened (IUCN 3.1)

Scientific classification
- Kingdom: Animalia
- Phylum: Chordata
- Class: Reptilia
- Order: Squamata
- Family: Cordylidae
- Genus: Cordylus
- Species: C. machadoi

Binomial name
- Cordylus machadoi Laurent, 1964

Synonyms
- Cordylus vittifer machadoi Laurent, 1964

Species of lizard

Machadoe's girdled lizard (Cordylus machadoi), also known commonly as Machado's girdled lizard, is a species of flattened lizard in the family Cordylidae. The species is native to southern Africa.

== Etymology ==
The specific name, machadoi, is in honor of Portuguese entomologist António de Barros-Machado, who collected the holotype in Angola.

== Geographic distribution ==
Cordylus machadoi is found in southwestern Angola and northwestern Namibia.

== Behavior and habitat ==
Cordylus machadoi occurs as solitary individuals or in pairs on rock outcrops in arid savanna, at elevations of 1,500–2,300 m (4,900–7,500 ft).

== Description ==
Cordylus machadoi can be identified, along with Cordylus vittifer, by have an elongate first row of dorsal scales. Machado's girdled lizard is uniform yellow brown above and paler below. The head is dark brown with pale lips. The pale vertebral stripe found in C. vittifer is not present. Adults of C. machadoi may attain a snout-to-vent length (SVL) of 7.8 cm (3.1 in).

== Reproduction ==
Cordylus machadoi is ovoviviparous.
