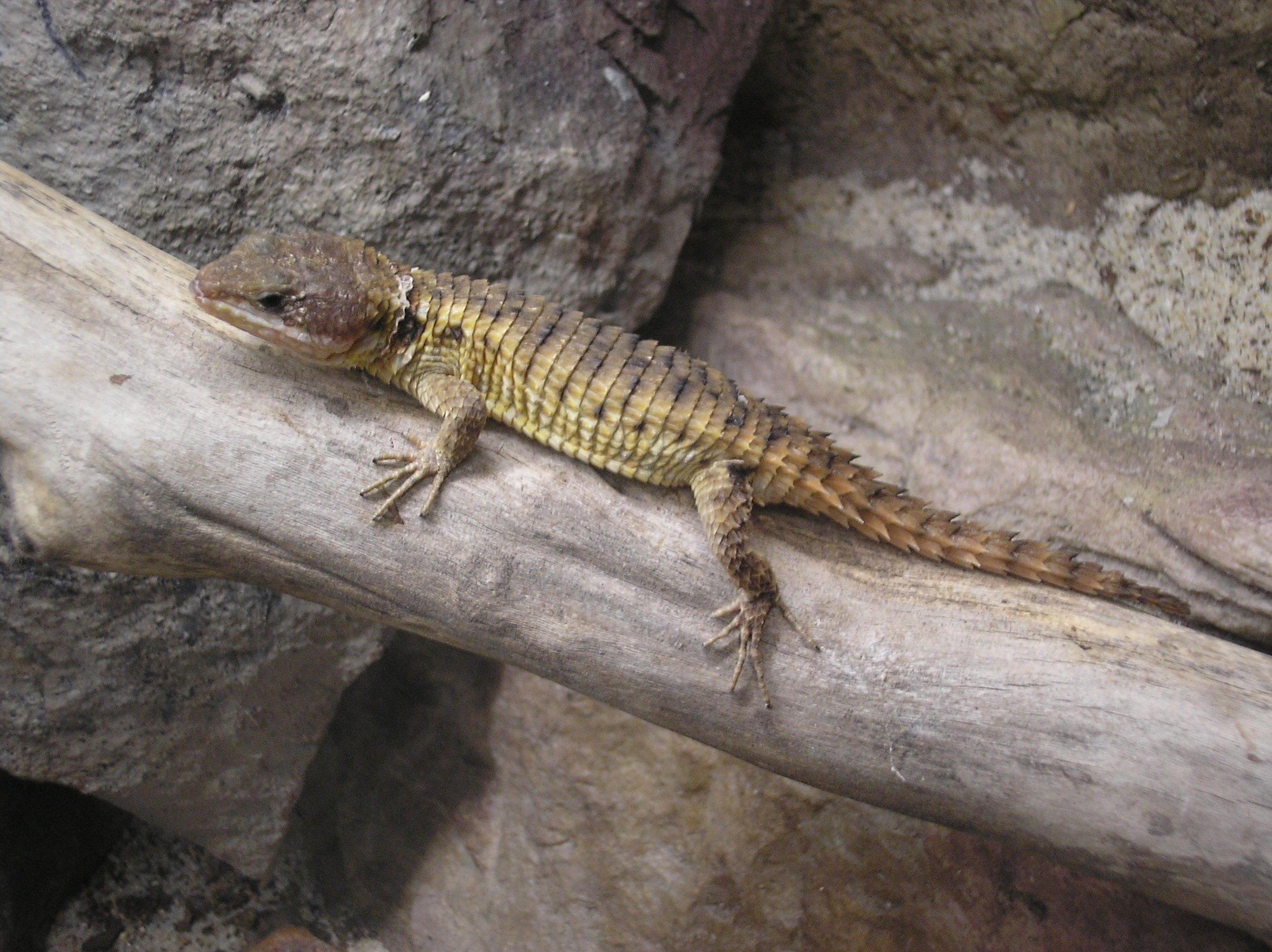
- Cordylus tropidosternum, tropical girdled lizard

Scientific classification
- Kingdom: Animalia
- Phylum: Chordata
- Class: Reptilia
- Order: Squamata
- Family: Cordylidae
- Genus: Cordylus; Laurenti, 1768

= Cordylus =

Genus of lizards

The genus Cordylus (Sauria: Cordylidae) includes a wide variety of species of small to medium spiny lizards from Africa, collectively called girdle-tailed lizards or girdled lizards. All are diurnal and ovoviviparous (live-bearing, without shelled eggs). Most species are rupicolous (rock-dwelling), while a few species are arboreal or live in burrows. They defend themselves with osteoderms (flat bony plates in the skin) and by quickly retreating into rock crevices or burrows. Many species live in groups, and males defend territories.

Cordylids are generally listed under CITES Appendix II. They are not necessarily threatened with extinction, but trade is controlled to prevent overexploitation. Some species of Cordylus have limited ranges and may be threatened with habitat destruction or over collecting for the pet trade.

== Classification ==
Broadley (2006) recognized 47 species in the genus Cordylus, including eight species originally placed in the genus Pseudocordylus (P. fasciatus, P. langi, P. melanotus, P. microlepidotus, P. nebulosus, P. spinosus, P. subviridis, and P. transvaalensis) and Hemicordylus capensis. The greatest diversity of cordylids is in South Africa, with a few species found in Angola and eastern Africa as far north as Ethiopia. Other members of the Cordylidae are the genera Chamaesaura (a group of legless lizards from southern and eastern Africa) and Platysaurus. The sister group of Cordylidae is the plated lizards, family Gerrhosauridae.

In 2011, a study based on the molecular phylogeny of the family suggested several species traditionally included in Cordylus should be moved to other genera: Hemicordylus (for capensis and nebulosus), Karusasaurus (for jordani and polyzonus), Namazonurus (for campbelli, lawrenci, namaquensis, peersi and pustulatus), Ninurta (for coeruleopunctatus), Ouroborus (for cataphractus) and Smaug (for breyeri, giganteus, mossambicus, regius, vandami and warreni). This classification is supported by the Reptile Database where 21 species remain in Cordylus.

Genus Cordylus (sensu stricto):

- Angolan girdled lizard, Cordylus angolensis (Bocage, 1895)
- Maasai girdled lizard, Cordylus beraduccii Broadley & Branch, 2002
- Cape girdled lizard, Cordylus cordylus (Linnaeus, 1758)
- Rooiberg girdled lizard, Cordylus imkeae Mouton & Van Wyk, 1994
- Limpopo girdled lizard, Cordylus jonesii (Boulenger, 1891)
- Machadoe's girdled lizard, Cordylus machadoi Laurent, 1964
- Coastal spiny-tailed lizard, Cordylus macropholis (Boulenger, 1910)
- Marungu girdled lizard, Cordylus marunguensis Greenbaum et al., 2012
- McLachlan's girdled lizard, Cordylus mclachlani Mouton, 1986
- Mecula girdled lizard, Cordylus meculae Branch, Rödel & Marais, 2005
- Dwarf girdled lizard, Cordylus minor V. FitzSimons, 1943
- Kaokoveld girdled lizard, Cordylus namakuiyus Stanley, Ceríaco, Bandeira, Valerio, Bates & Branch, 2016
- Black girdled lizard, Cordylus niger Cuvier, 1829

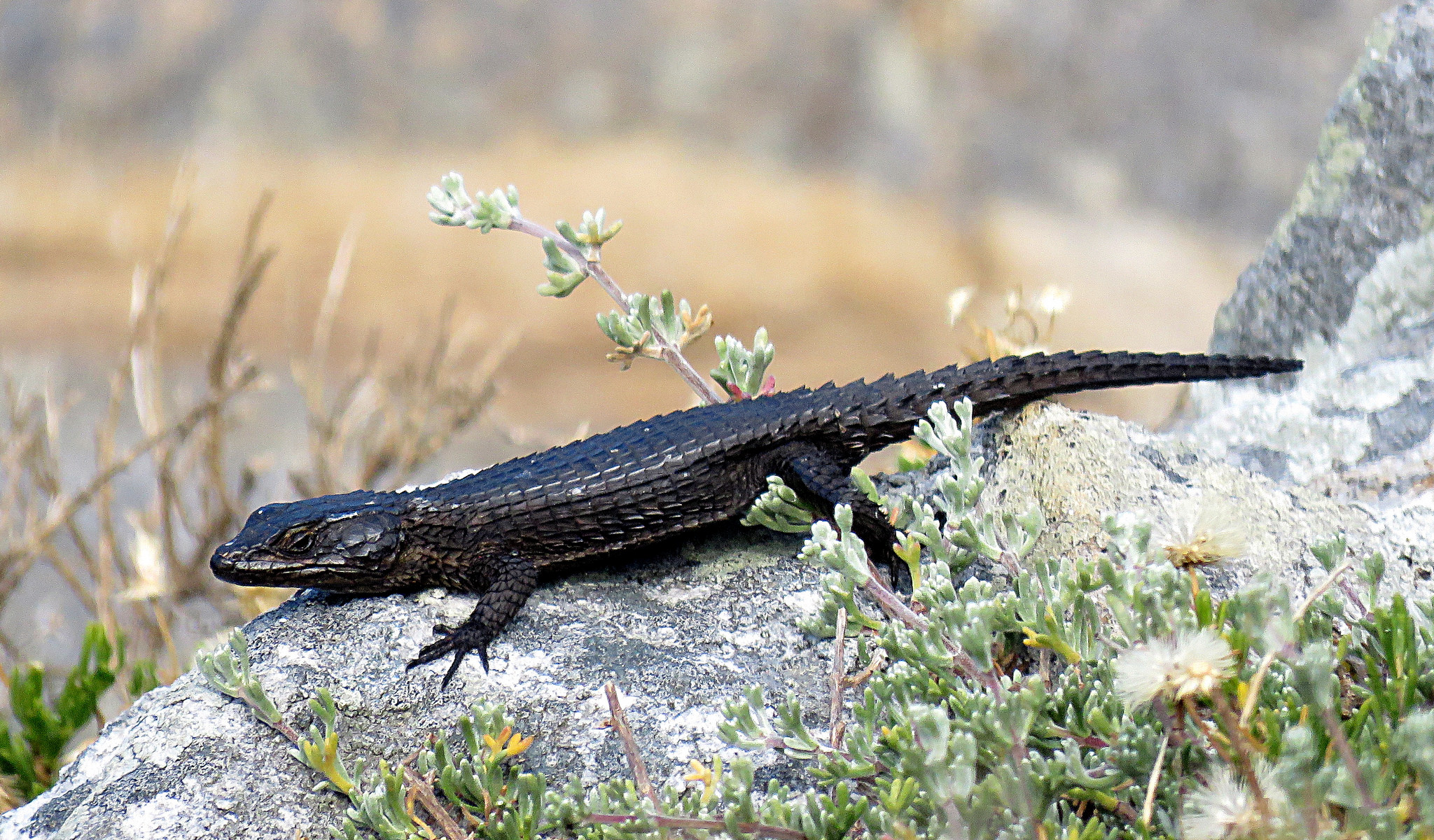
Cordylus niger, endemic to two small areas of South Africa.

- Nyika girdled lizard, Cordylus nyikae Broadley & Mouton, 2000
- Oelofsen's girdled lizard, Cordylus oelofseni Mouton & Van Wyk, 1990
- N’Dolondolo girdled lizard, Cordylus phonolithos Marques, Ceríaco, Stanley, Bandeira, Agarwal & Bauer, 2019
- Rhodesian girdled lizard, Cordylus rhodesianus (Hewitt, 1933)
- Ethiopian girdled lizard, Cordylus rivae (Boulenger, 1896)
- East African spiny-tailed lizard, Cordylus tropidosternum (Cope, 1869)
- Ukinga girdled lizard, Cordylus ukingensis (Loveridge, 1932)
- Transvaal girdled lizard, Cordylus vittifer (Reichenow, 1887)

Nota bene: A binomial authority in parentheses indicates that the species was originally described in a genus other than Cordylus.

Formerly assigned in Cordylus (sensu lato):

- species in the genus Hemicordylus
- species in the genus Karusasaurus
- species in the genus Namazonurus
- Blue-spotted girdled lizard, Ninurta coeruleopunctatus
- Armadillo girdled lizard, Ouroborus cataphractus
- species in the genus Pseudocordylus
- species in the genus Smaug
