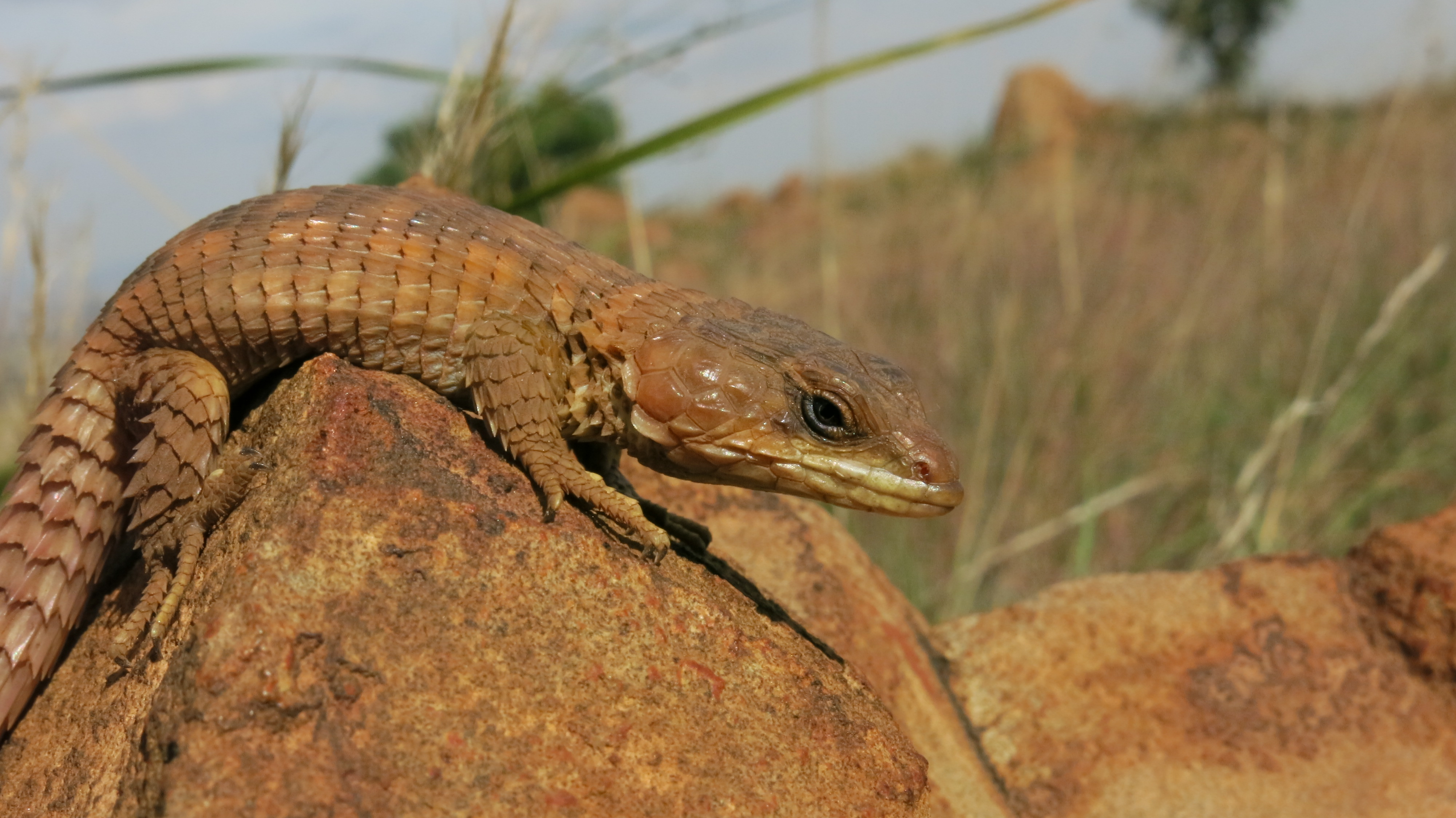
- At Klipriviersberg, Johannesburg

Conservation status
- Least Concern (IUCN 3.1)

Scientific classification
- Kingdom: Animalia
- Phylum: Chordata
- Class: Reptilia
- Order: Squamata
- Suborder: Scinciformata
- Infraorder: Scincomorpha
- Family: Cordylidae
- Genus: Cordylus
- Species: C. vittifer

Binomial name
- Cordylus vittifer (Reichenow, 1887)

= Transvaal girdled lizard =

Species of lizard

The Transvaal girdled lizard or Reichenow's spiny-tailed lizard (Cordylus vittifer) is a very flattened girdled lizard from northeastern South Africa, Eswatini, and southeastern Botswana. It prefers rock outcrops in open grassland and feeds on small arthropods, especially beetles.

== Description ==
This species grows to about 95 mm long from snout to vent. Femoral pores are absent from females in some populations. Transvaal girdled lizards are distinguished from most other girdled lizards by elongation of the first row of dorsal scales directly behind the head. These scales are approximately twice the length from base to tip than the following dorsal scales on the neck. The dorsal coloration is variable—uniform straw brown to dark brown or with irregular dark spots and orange-yellow flanks. A pale stripe often runs down the middle of the back. A population in the northeastern Free State, South Africa has distinct dark lateral stripes and may represent a distinct species.

== Relationships ==
The Transvaal girdled lizard is closely related to Machadoe's girdled lizard (Cordylus machadoi) from northwestern Namibia. Both species have an elongate first row of dorsal scales. Machadoe's girdled lizard is uniform yellow brown above and paler below. The head is dark brown with pale lips. The pale vertebral stripe found in the Transvaal girdled lizard is not present.

== Pet trade ==
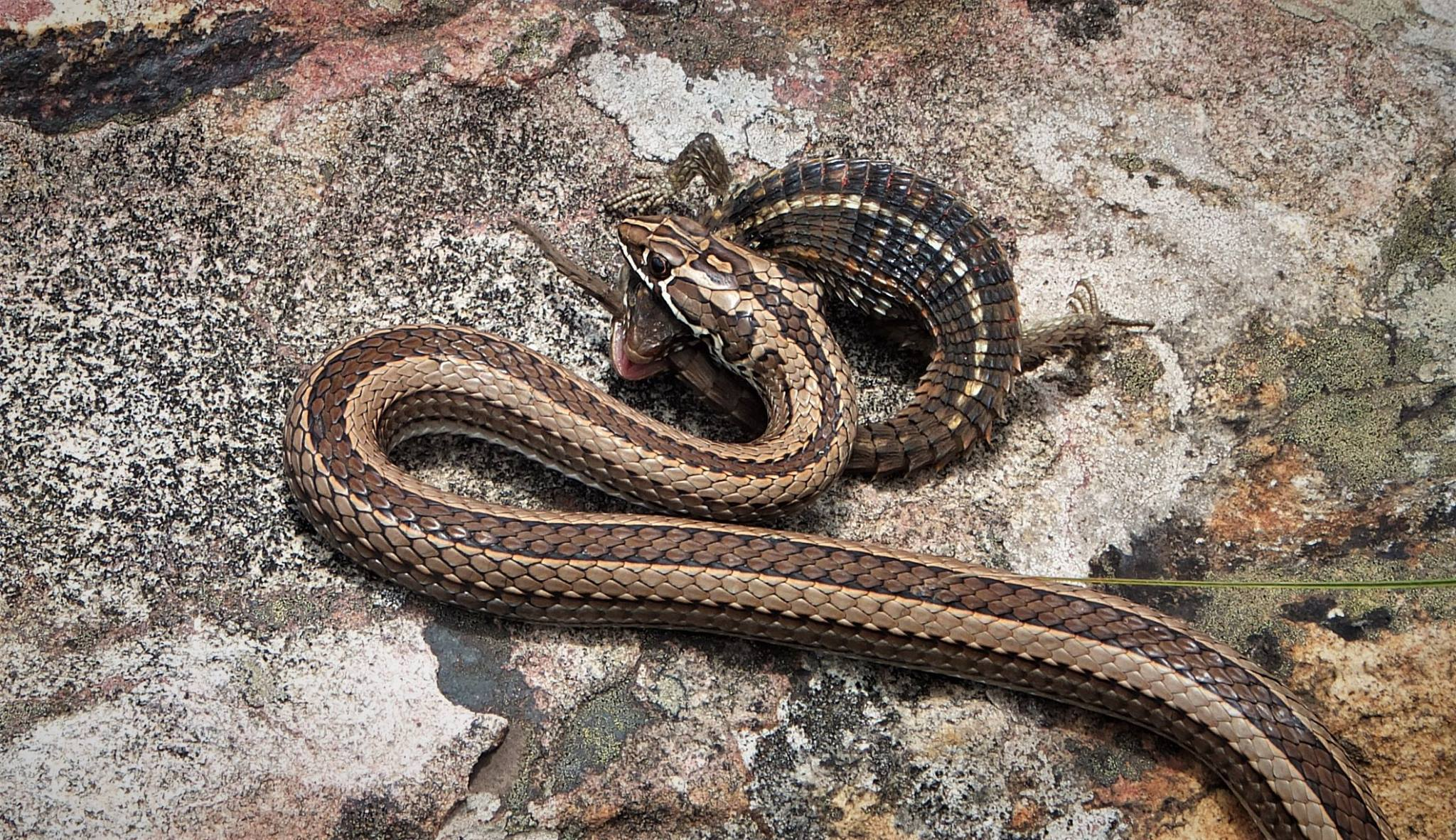
Falling prey to a sand snake

Specimens labeled as Transvaal girdled lizards are exported from Mozambique. Most individuals are not C. vittifer, but in fact Limpopo girdled lizards (Cordylus jonesii). The Limpopo girdled lizard can be quickly distinguished from C. vittifer by its rounded, not flattened, body. The Limpopo girdled lizard also lacks the elongate first row of dorsal scales.
