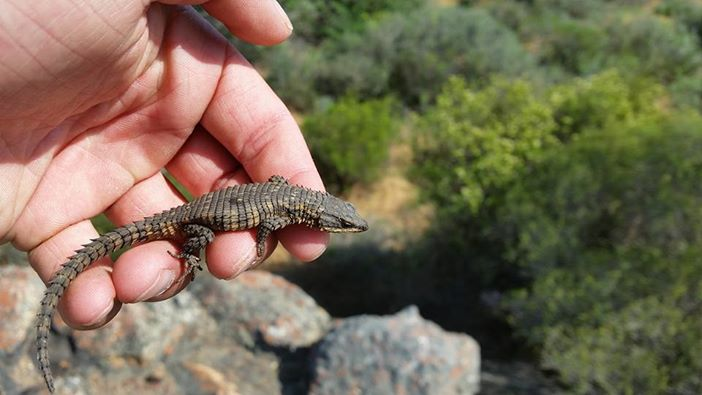
- Cordylus mclachlani

Conservation status
- Least Concern (IUCN 3.1)

Scientific classification
- Kingdom: Animalia
- Phylum: Chordata
- Class: Reptilia
- Order: Squamata
- Family: Cordylidae
- Genus: Cordylus
- Species: C. mclachlani

Binomial name
- Cordylus mclachlani Mouton, 1986

= McLachlan's girdled lizard =

Species of lizard

McLachlan's girdled lizard (Cordylus mclachlani), also known commonly as McLachlan's spiny-tailed lizard, is a species of lizard in the family Cordylidae. The species is endemic to South Africa.

== Etymology ==
The specific name, mclachlani, is in honor of South African herpetologist Geoffrey Roy McLachlan.

== Description ==
Adults of Cordylus mclachlani usually have a snout-to-vent length (SVL) of 5–7 cm (2.0–2.8 in). The body is very flattened. Dorsally, it is olive brown, with some dark brown and yellow spots. Ventrally, it is cream-colored.

== Geographic distribution ==
Cordylus mclachlani is found in the South African provinces of Northern Cape and Western Cape.

== Habitat ==
The preferred natural habitat of Cordylus mclachlani is rocky areas of shrubland.

== Behavior ==
Cordylus mclachlani is terrestrial and rupicolous (rock-dwelling), sheltering in narrow crevices.

== Reproduction ==
Cordylus mclachlani is ovoviviparous.
