= Girdling =

Removal of the bark from around the entire circumference

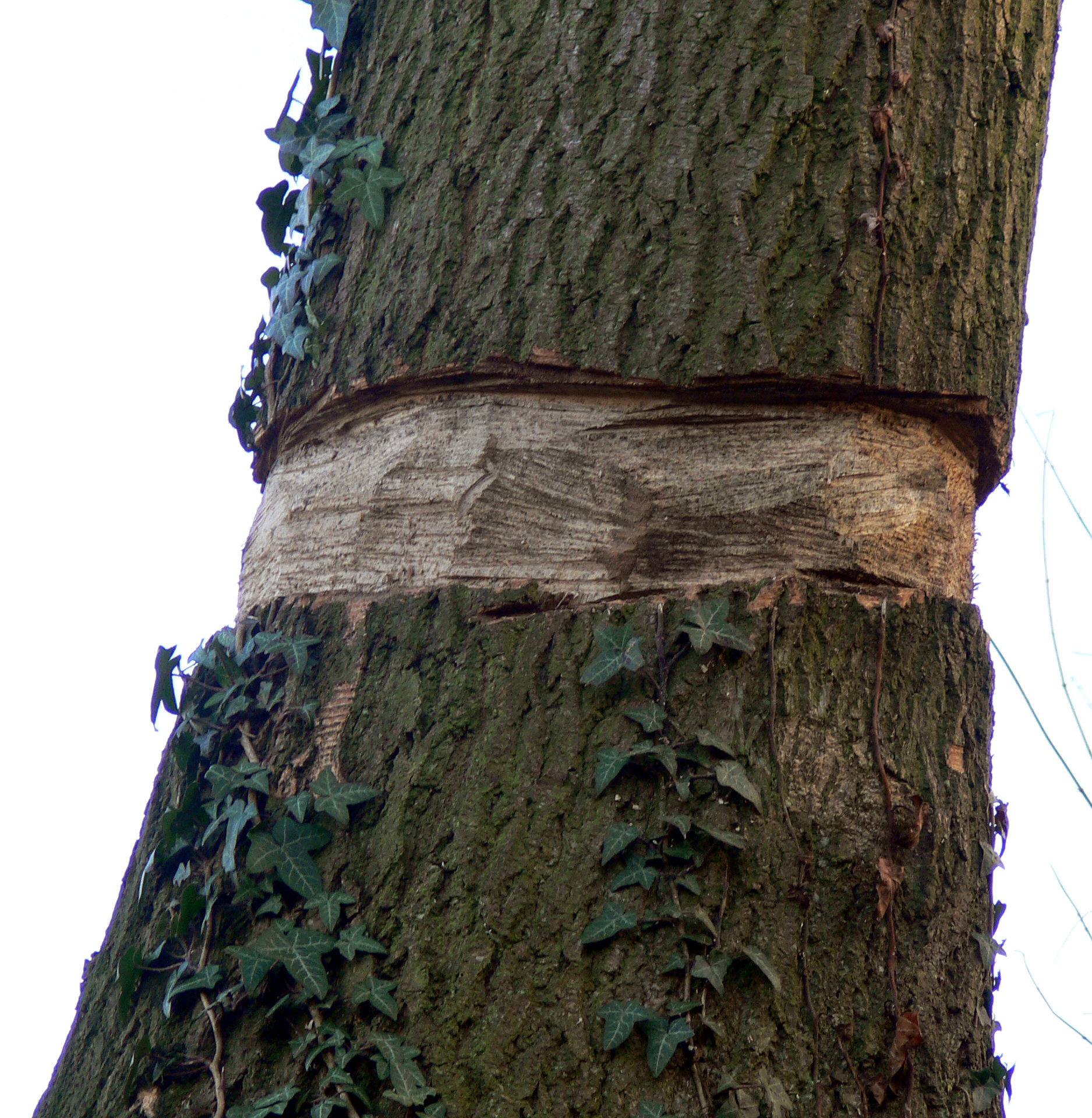
Girdling in Lille, Northern France

Girdling, also called ring-barking, is the circumferential removal or injury of the bark (Note: Consisting of the periderm, phloem, vascular cambium and sometimes also the xylem.)) of a woody plant. Girdling prevents the tree from sending nutrients from its foliage to its roots, resulting in the death of the tree over time; it can also prevent flow of nutrients in the other direction depending on how much of the xylem is removed. A branch completely girdled will fail and, if the main trunk of a tree is girdled, the entire tree will die if it cannot regrow from above to bridge the wound.

Human practices of girdling include forestry, horticulture, and vandalism. Foresters use the practice of girdling to thin forests. Extensive cankers caused by certain fungi, bacteria or viruses can girdle a trunk or limb. Animals such as rodents will girdle trees by feeding on outer bark, often during winter under snow. Girdling can also be caused by herbivorous mammals feeding on plant bark and by birds and insects, both of which can effectively girdle a tree by boring rows of adjacent holes. Orchardists use girdling as a cultural technique to yield larger fruit or to set fruit. In viticulture (grape cultivation), the technique is also called "cincturing".

== Forestry ==
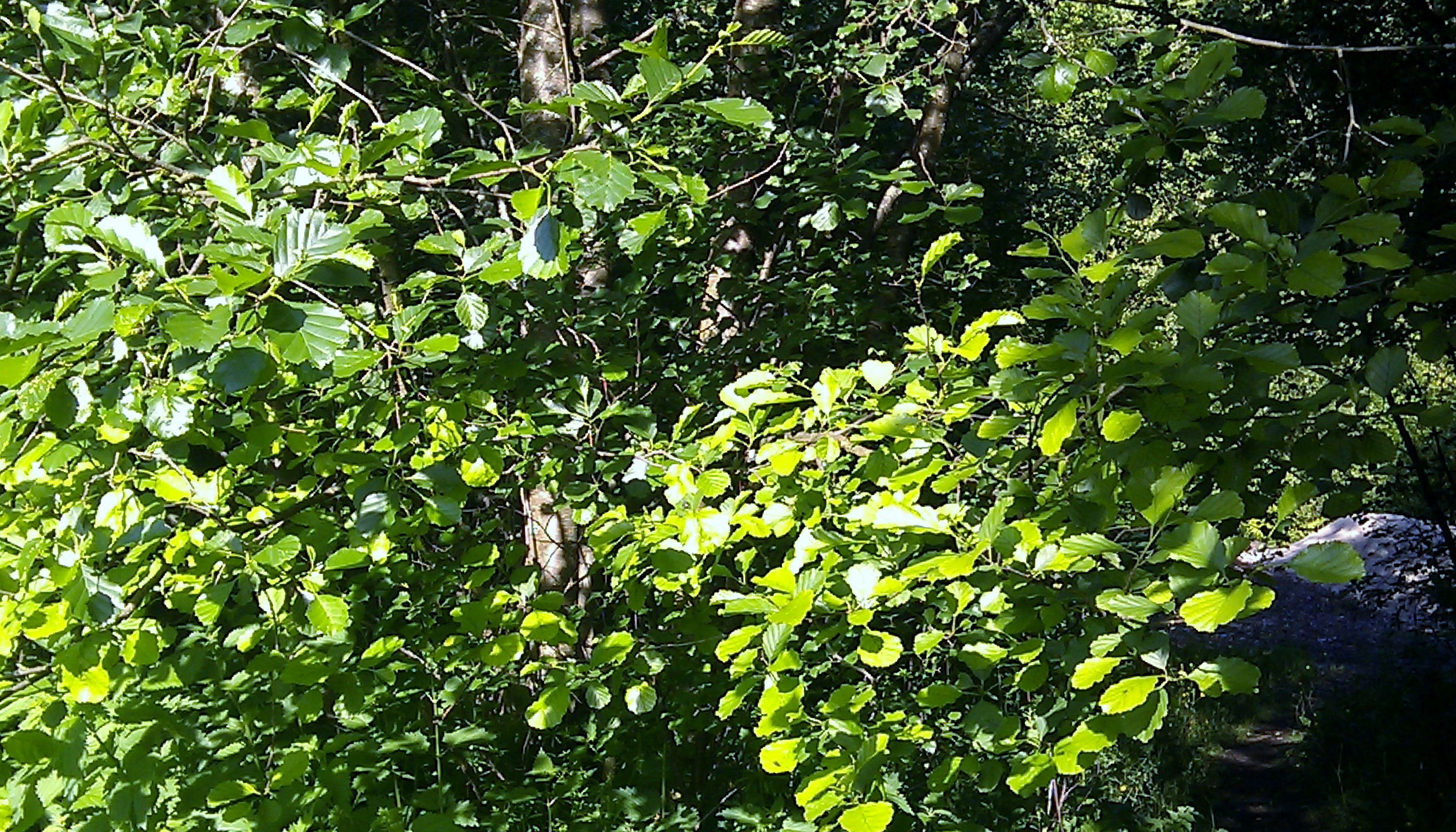
Yellowing of alder leaves due to girdling

Like all vascular plants, trees use two vascular tissues for transportation of water and nutrients: the xylem (also known as the wood) and the phloem (the innermost layer of the bark). Girdling results in the removal of the phloem, and death occurs from the inability of the leaves to transport sugars (primarily sucrose) to the roots. In this process, the xylem is left untouched, and the tree can usually still temporarily transport water and minerals from the roots to the leaves. Trees normally sprout shoots below the wound; if not, the roots die. Death occurs when the roots can no longer produce ATP and transport nutrients upwards through the xylem. The formation of new shoots below the wound can be prevented by painting the wound with herbicide.

Girdling is a slow process compared to felling and is often used only when necessary, such as in the removal of an individual tree from an ecologically protected area without damaging surrounding growth. An example is the girdling of selected Douglas-fir trees in some Northern California oak woodlands, such as Annadel State Park, in order to prevent that Douglas-fir from massive invasion of the mixed oak woodland. Girdling can be used to create standing dead wood, or snags. This can provide a valuable habitat for a variety of wildlife, including insects and nesting birds.

Accidental girdling is also possible and some activities must be performed with care. Saplings which are tied to a supporting stake may unintentionally be girdled as they grow, due to friction caused by contact with the tie. If ropes are tied frequently to a tree (e.g. to tether an animal or moor a boat), the friction of the rope can also lead to the removal of bark.

== Horticulture ==
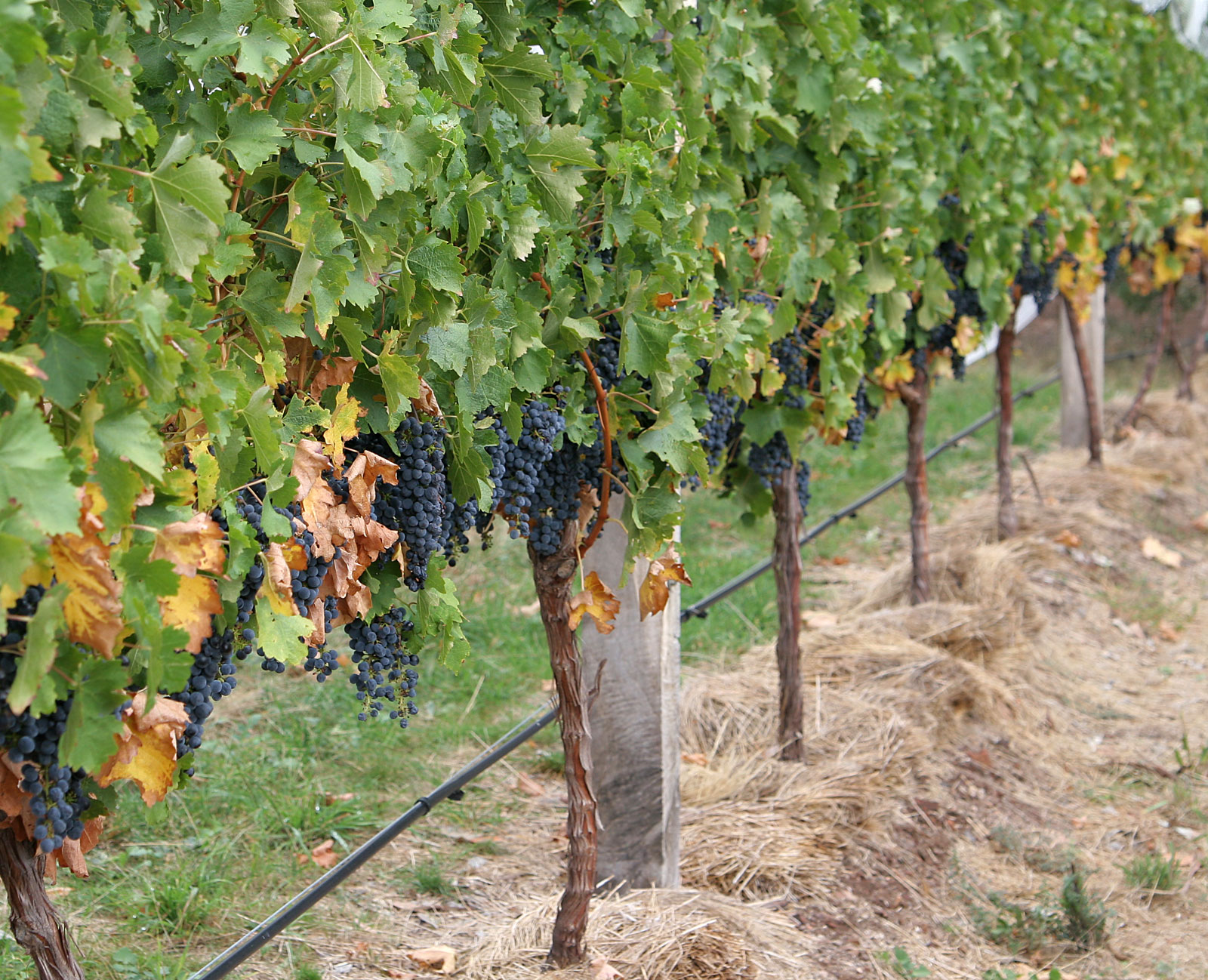
Grape vines and their canopies

Girdling is also used as a technique to force a fruit-bearing plant to bear larger fruit. A farmer would place a girdle (bark removal) at base of a large branch or at the trunk. Thus, all sugars manufactured by the leaves have no sinks but the fruit, which grows to above the normal size. For grapes girdling or cincturing is used to make the grapes large and sweeter on the grape canopy and are sold as girdled grapes. Flowering and fruit setting is a problem on some trees; girdling may improve yield in the same way. The "damage" done by girdling restricts the movement of nutrients to the roots, thus the carbohydrates produced in the leaves do not go to the roots for storage. Girdling temporarily stops tree growth and thus can serve as a form of pruning. Root pruning, an ancient Asian practice, and other controlled damaging, such as driving nails into the trunk or beating the branches and trunk, produce results that are similar to girdling. Girdling is commonly used on grape, avocado, apple, litchi, mango, citrus and other trees. Girdling is normally only done to healthy trees that did not yield well the previous year. Care must be used not to damage sapwood that may kill the tree or vine. Trees normally heal in four to five weeks after cincturing. Painting the cut can protect against fungus and pests.

== By other organisms ==
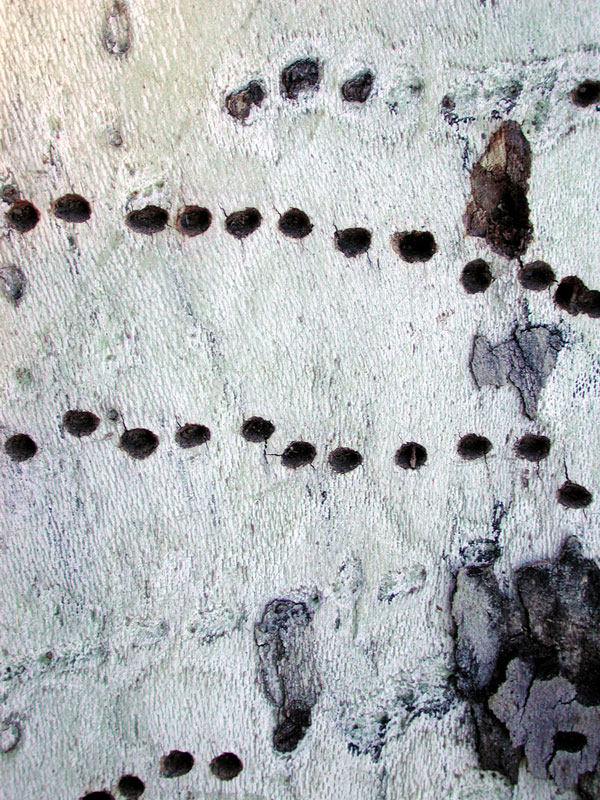
Holes drilled by red-naped sapsucker in Platanus wrightii (Arizona sycamore)

In North America, trees are prone to damage by voles in particular girdling both their roots and trunk. Among North American birds, the sapsuckers are the most common girdlers of trees. While sapsuckers will bore holes in tree trunks to feed upon insects, they also make parallel rings of holes in order to eat sap that collects in the openings or to feed it to their young. They most frequently attack pine, birch, maple, spruce and fruit trees and do the most damage during breeding season and territory establishment between February and June.

Beavers girdle the bases of stems 3–6 inches (76–152 mm) in diameter, and girdle the roots of larger trees. This often weakens or kills trees.

In the United Kingdom and other parts of Europe, the eastern grey squirrel is also known to girdle or entirely strip bark from trees.

Bucks (male deer) inadvertently girdle trees by rubbing their antlers on trees of various ages.

The beetle agrilus biguttatus can girdle trees through their feeding behavior and create zigzag galleries that measure up to 1.5 meters (4 ft 11 in) in length. Girdling is also the effect of the emerald ash borer, a similar debarking beetle that has killed tens of millions of ash trees in the United States.

One of several ways rabbits damage the environment in Australia is by girdling.

Trees can be girdled by climbing, twining, and ground-creeping (rampant) vines. There are several invasive species that harm trees in this way and cause significant damage to forest canopy and the health of ecosystems dependent on it. Oriental Bittersweet, Oriental Wisteria, and English Ivy all can damage and kill trees by girdling.

== See also ==
- Debarking (lumber)
- Forest pathology
- Pruning
- Grafting
- Arborist
- Coppicing
- Fruit tree forms
- Lopping
- Pollarding
- Pruning fruit trees
- Topiary
- Dead hedge (which can be made from pruned branches to attract insects for hibernation and pollination)
- Annual growth cycle of grapevines
- Propagation of grapevines
- List of animals referred to as girdled
