= Girdle =

Belt, esp. as a liturgical vestment

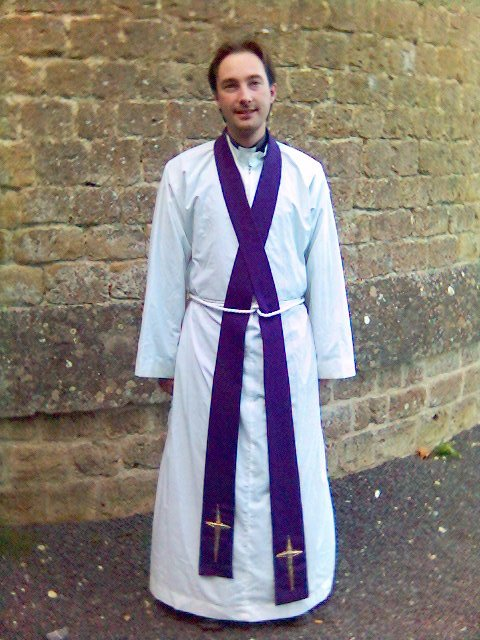
A Christian (Anglican) priest wearing a white girdle around his waist to hold his alb and stole in place.

A girdle is a belt without a buckle, especially if made of a cord or rope. Historically girdles were a common part of everyday clothing, from antiquity until perhaps the 15th century, especially for women. Most girdles were practical pieces of costume to hold other pieces in place, but some were loose and essentially for decoration. Among the elite these might include precious metals and jewels.

Today, girdles are part of Christian liturgical vestments. The word is also used in other contexts, such as American sports (for what is really a kind of underwear).

The girdle as an undergarment or abbreviated corset around the waist is a different, essentially 20th-century, concept. But from around 1895 there was a fashion for "girdles" as a separate section of a fashionable dress, worn just above the waist on top of the main dress. It was typically up to about eight inches high, and often terminated in a "V" shape. It might be the same colour as the main dress or not. It differs from the earlier Swiss waist of the mid-19th century by not having lacing or boning.

== History ==
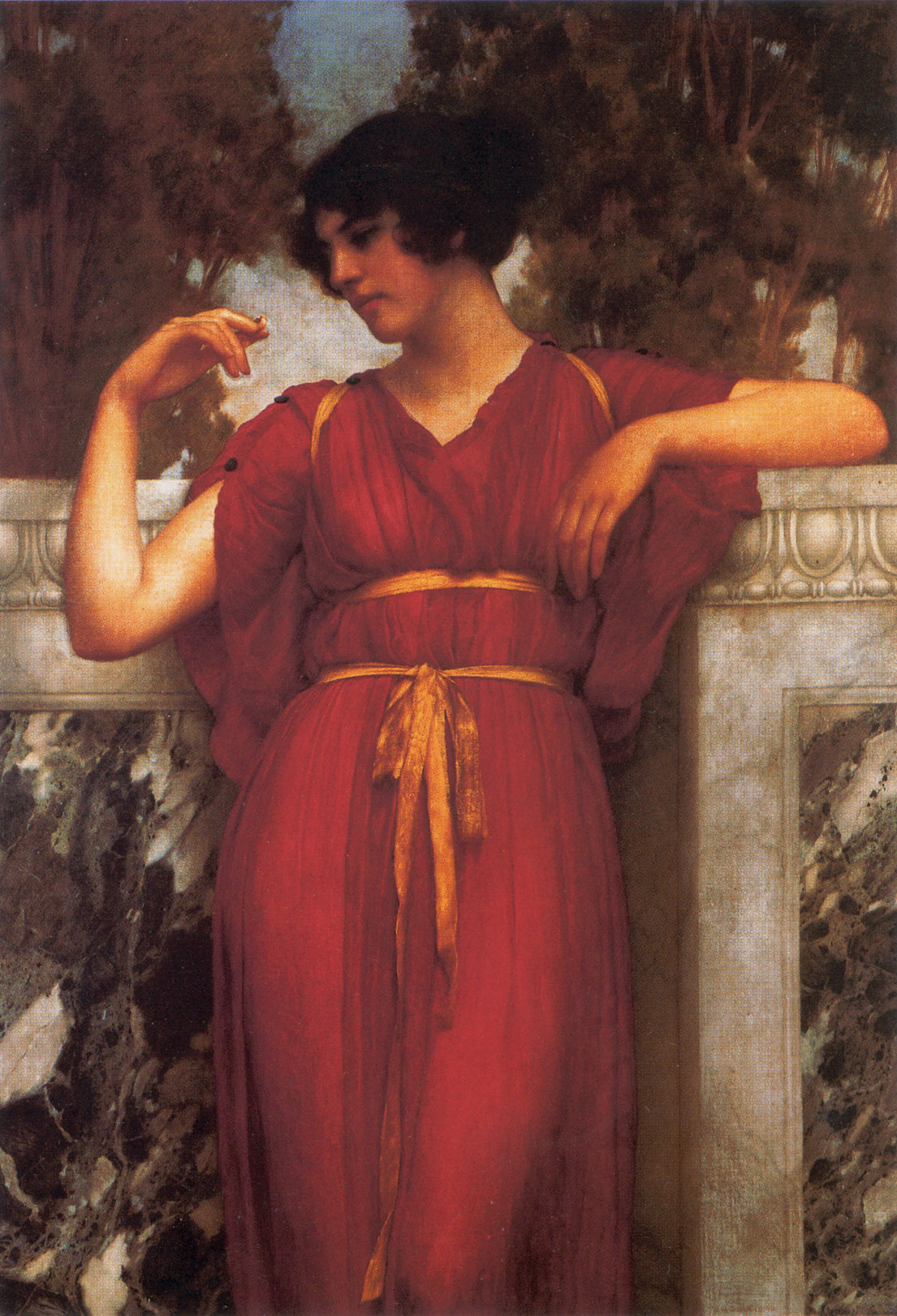
Grecian style tunic wrapped with a taenia (ribbon) girdle.

The men among the Greeks and Romans wore the girdle upon the loins, and it served them to confine the tunic, and hold the purse, instead of pockets, which were unknown; girls and women wore it under the bosom. The Strophium, Taenia, or Mitra occurs in many figures. In the small bronze Pallas of the Villa Albani, and in figures on the Hamilton Vases, are three cordons with a knot, detached from two ends of the girdle, which is fixed under the bosom. This girdle forms under the breast a knot of ribbon, sometimes in the form of a rose, as occur on the two handsomest daughters of Niobe. Upon the youngest the ends of the girdle pass over the shoulders, and upon the back, as they do upon four Caryatides found at Monte Portio. This part of the dress the ancients called, at least in the time of Isidore, Succinctorium or Bracile.

The girdle was omitted by both sexes in mourning. Often when the tunic was very long, and would otherwise be entangled by the feet, it was drawn over the girdle in such a way as to conceal the latter entirely underneath its folds. It is not uncommon to see two girdles of different widths worn together, one very high up, the other very low down, so as to form between the two in the tunic, a puckered interval; but this fashion was mostly applied to short tunics. The tunic of the Greek males was almost always confined by a girdle.

Among the Anglo-Saxons, it was used by both sexes; by the men to confine their tunic, and support the sword. Some were richly embroidered, and of white leather. A leather strap was chiefly worn by monks. Metal girdles were manufactured by girdlers.

== Vestment and iconography ==
=== Christian usage ===
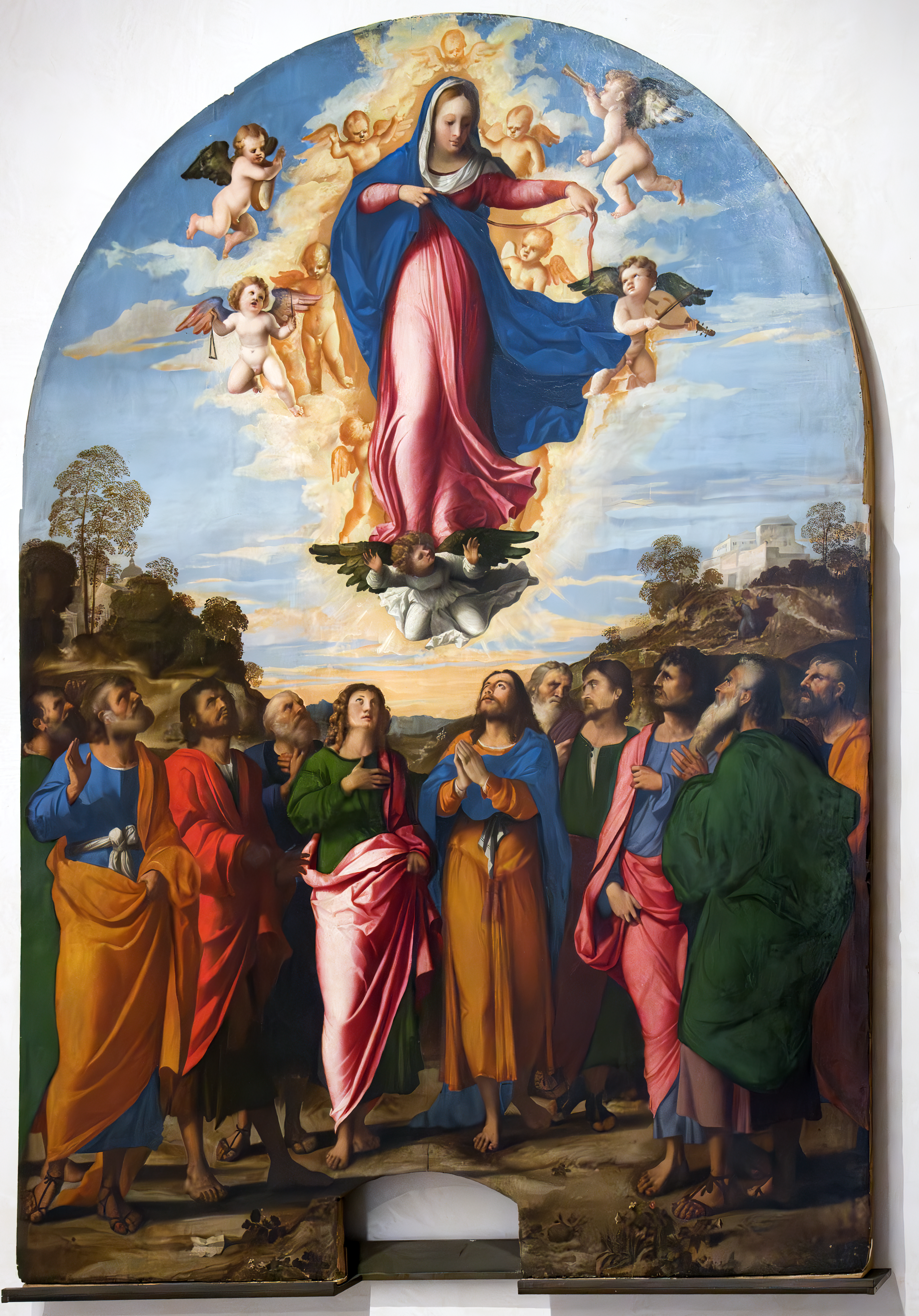
In Catholic belief, the Girdle of Thomas is said to be handed down by the Virgin Mary during her Assumption

As a Christian liturgical vestment, the girdle is a long, rope-like cord tied around the waist over the alb or cassock. The Parson's Handbook describes the girdle as being made "generally of white linen rope, and may have a tassel at each end. About 12 ft. 6 in. long is a very convenient size if it is used double, one end being then turned into a noose and the tasselled ends slipped through. The girdle, however, may be coloured." They are used to close a cassock in Christian denominations, including the Anglican Communion, Catholic Church, Methodist Church and Lutheran Church.

Christian monastics would often hang religious texts, such as the Bible or Breviary, from their girdles and these became known as girdle books. In addition, they would often knot the ends of the girdle thrice, in order to represent the "vows of poverty, chastity, and obedience." As such, within the Christian Church, the girdle, in some contexts, represents chastity and within the Hebrew Bible, "Proverbs 31 provides biblical reference to the ancient practice of girdle making by virtuous chaste women". In the New Testament, "Christ referred to the girdle as a symbol of preparation and readiness for service (Luke 12:35–38)":

Be dressed ready for service and keep your lamps burning, like servants waiting for their master to return from a wedding banquet, so that when he comes and knocks they can immediately open the door for him. It will be good for those servants whose master finds them watching when he comes. Truly I tell you, he will dress himself to serve, will have them recline at the table and will come and wait on them. It will be good for those servants whose master finds them ready, even if he comes in the middle of the night or toward daybreak.

Saint Paul, in Ephesians 6:14 also references the term, stating "Stand therefore, first fastening round you the girdle of truth and putting on the breastplate of uprightness", further buttressing the concept of the girdle as a symbol of readiness. Many Christian clergy, such as Anglican priests and Methodist ministers, use the following prayer when wearing the girdle:

Gird me, O Lord, with the girdle of purity, and quench in me the fire of concupiscence that the grace of temperance and chastity may abide in me.

By the 8th century AD, the girdle became established as a liturgical vestment "in the strict sense of the word." In 800 AD, the girdle began to be worn by Christian deacons in the Eastern Church.

Although the general word "cincture" is sometimes used as a synonym for the girdle, liturgical manuals distinguish between the two, as the "girdle is a long cord or rope while the cincture is a wide sash. Generally an alb is closed with a girdle, an Anglican-style double-breasted cassock is closed with a cincture, and a Roman cassock is closed with either one."

In the medieval and early modern period there are also accounts of girdles being used as a mnemonic. These would be tied or decorated with bead so that, like a rosary, each notch would remind the wearer of a particular psalm or book. The girdle, in the 8th or 9th century, was said to resemble an ancient Levitical Jewish vestment, and in that era, was not visible.

The girdle, for men, symbolizes preparation and readiness to serve, and for women, represents chastity and protection; it was also worn by laypersons in the Middle Ages, as attested in literature. For example, the hagiographical account of Saint George and the Dragon mentions the evildoer being tamed with the sign of the cross and a girdle handed to Saint George by a virgin.

=== In Judaism ===
A gartel is a belt worn by Jewish males, predominantly (but not exclusively) Hasidim, during prayer. "Gartel" is Yiddish for "belt" and is cognate with the English word "girdle". Gartels are generally very modest in appearance. Most are black, but some gartels are white. Hasidic custom requires that there be a physical divide between the heart and the genitalia during any mention of God's name. It is commonly explained that separating the upper and lower parts of the body manifests a control of the animal instincts of the person by the distinctly human intellect.

=== Indian religions ===
In the Vajrayana iconography of the Hevajra Tantra, the 'girdle' (Tib.: ske rags), one of the 'Five Bone Ornaments' (aṣṭhiamudrā) symbolizes Amoghasiddhi and the 'accomplishing pristine awareness' (Kṛty-anuṣṭhāna-jñāna), one of the 'Five Wisdoms' (pañca-jñāna). The iconography of the girdle (or bone apron and belt) in Vajrayana iconography developed from one of the items of vestment adorning the Mahasiddha of the charnel grounds.

Beer (1999: p. 318) describes the bone girdle as the 'netted bone apron and belt' as vesture of the Dakinis and Heruka of the Cham Dance and Gar Dance of Tibetan Buddhism sacred ritual dance performances:

The bone ornaments worn in these ritual dances are exquisitely carved – especially the netted bone apron and belt, which are commonly adorned with intricately carved images of dakinis.

== Girdles in literature and mythology ==
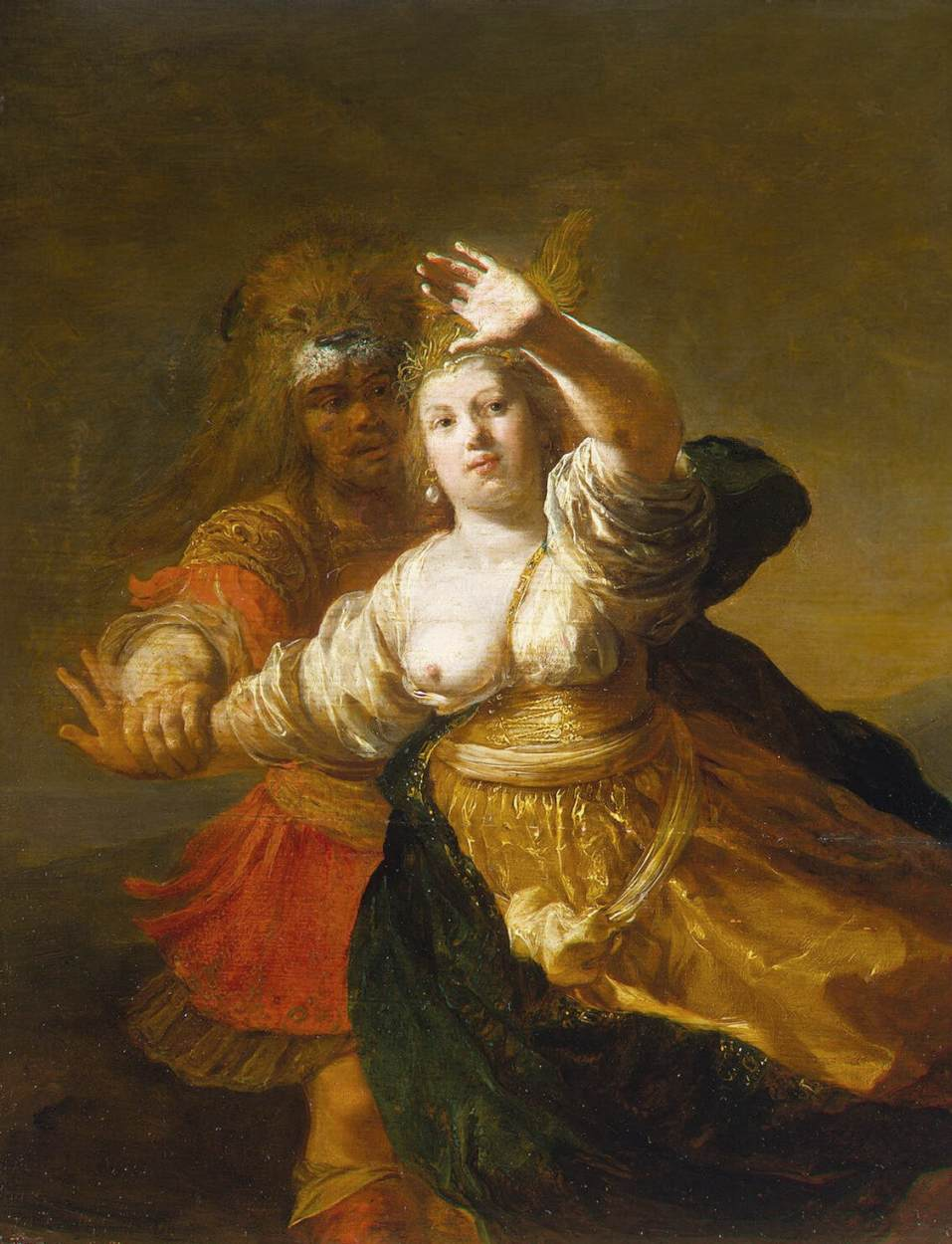
Hercules Obtaining the Girdle of Hippolyta (Nikolaus Knüpfer, 17th century)

Girdles are often portrayed as magical, giving power and strength if worn by men, and protection if worn by women. Several scriptures in the Bible make use of the girdle as a symbol for readiness and preparation.

In Greek mythology, both men and women were described as wearing girdles. Hephaestus gifted his wife Aphrodite with a girdle that made the wearer irresistible to others, which Hera used to seduce Zeus in the Iliad. For his ninth labor, Heracles was sent to obtain the girdle of Hippolyta, queen of the Amazons. In the Odyssey, Leucothea gives Odysseus a girdle-like "veil" that allows him to swim for three days straight.

The Babylonian goddess Ishtar wore a girdle, which, when it was removed, rendered the universe barren. The Norse god Thor's girdle Megingjörð doubled his strength.

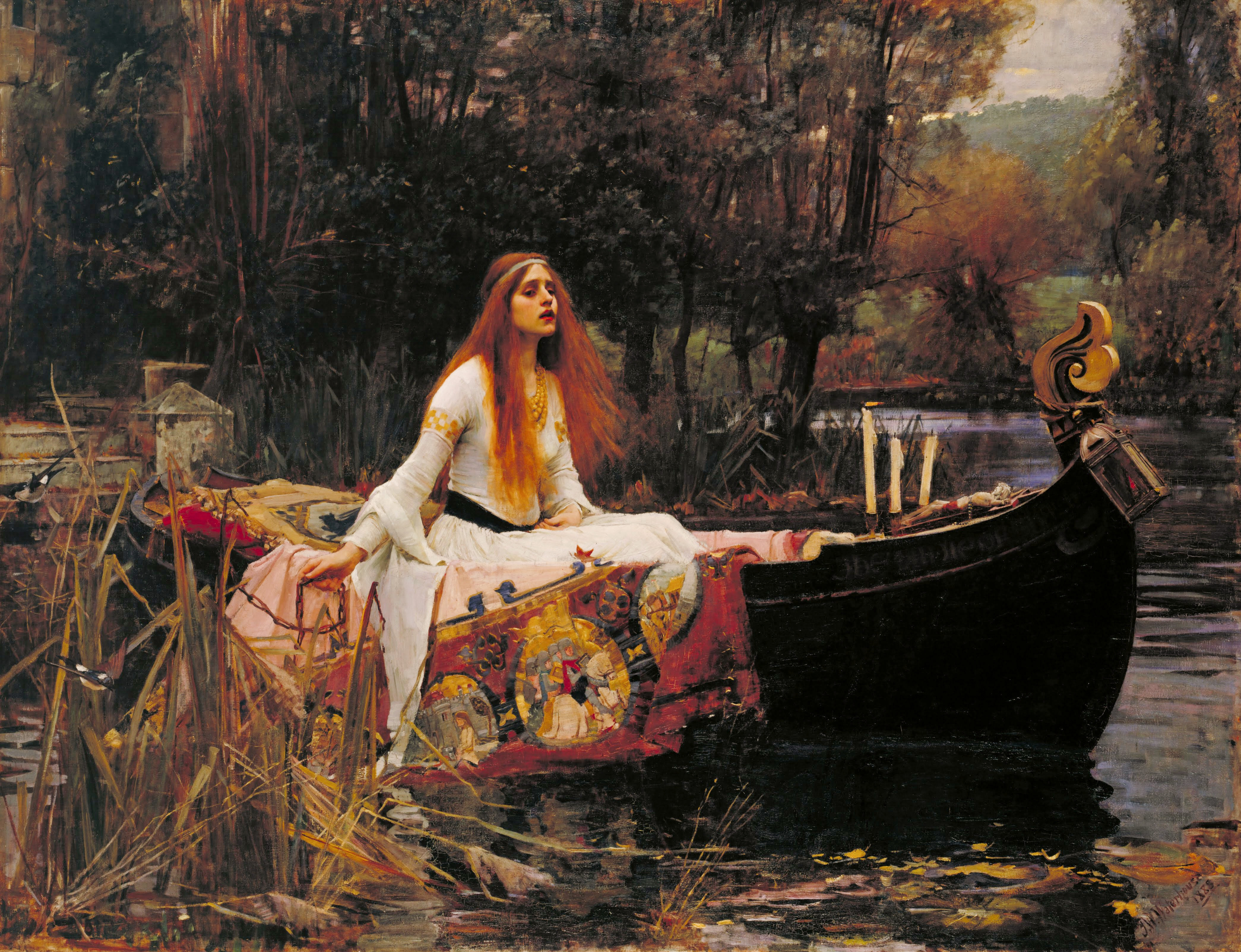
The Lady of Shalott, with a medieval girdle around her waist (John William Waterhouse, 1888)

Later, for women, the girdle became a sign of virginity, and was often considered to have magical properties. Monsters and all types of evil are recorded as being subdued by girdles in literature, a famous one being the dragon slain by Saint George. Marriage ceremonies continued this tradition of girdles symbolizing virginity by having the husband take the wife's girdle, and prostitutes were forbidden to wear them by law in historic France. Often in literature, women are portrayed as safe from sexual or other attack when wearing a girdle, but suddenly vulnerable if it is missing or stolen.

Non-clothing uses in literature include Tolkien's "Girdle of Melian", a magical, protective "wall" surrounding an elven kingdom.

== Sports ==
In American football, what is called a girdle is worn under the football player's pants to keep the hip, thigh, and tailbone pads in place, making the process of putting on the tight football pants easier. Older girdles resembled chaps, in that they covered only the front of the leg with pads, that snapped on. Modern girdles are essentially a tight pair of compression shorts with pockets for the pads. The girdle was also used in the Mesoamerican ballgame and is used in hockey (National Hockey League).

Some designs are made specifically for use in the sport of ringette.

== See also ==
- Confraternities of the Cord
- Girdle of Thomas
- Girdle book
- List of animals referred to as girdled
- Kushti worn by Zoroastrians
- Himiana worn by Mandaeans
- Zone (vestment)
