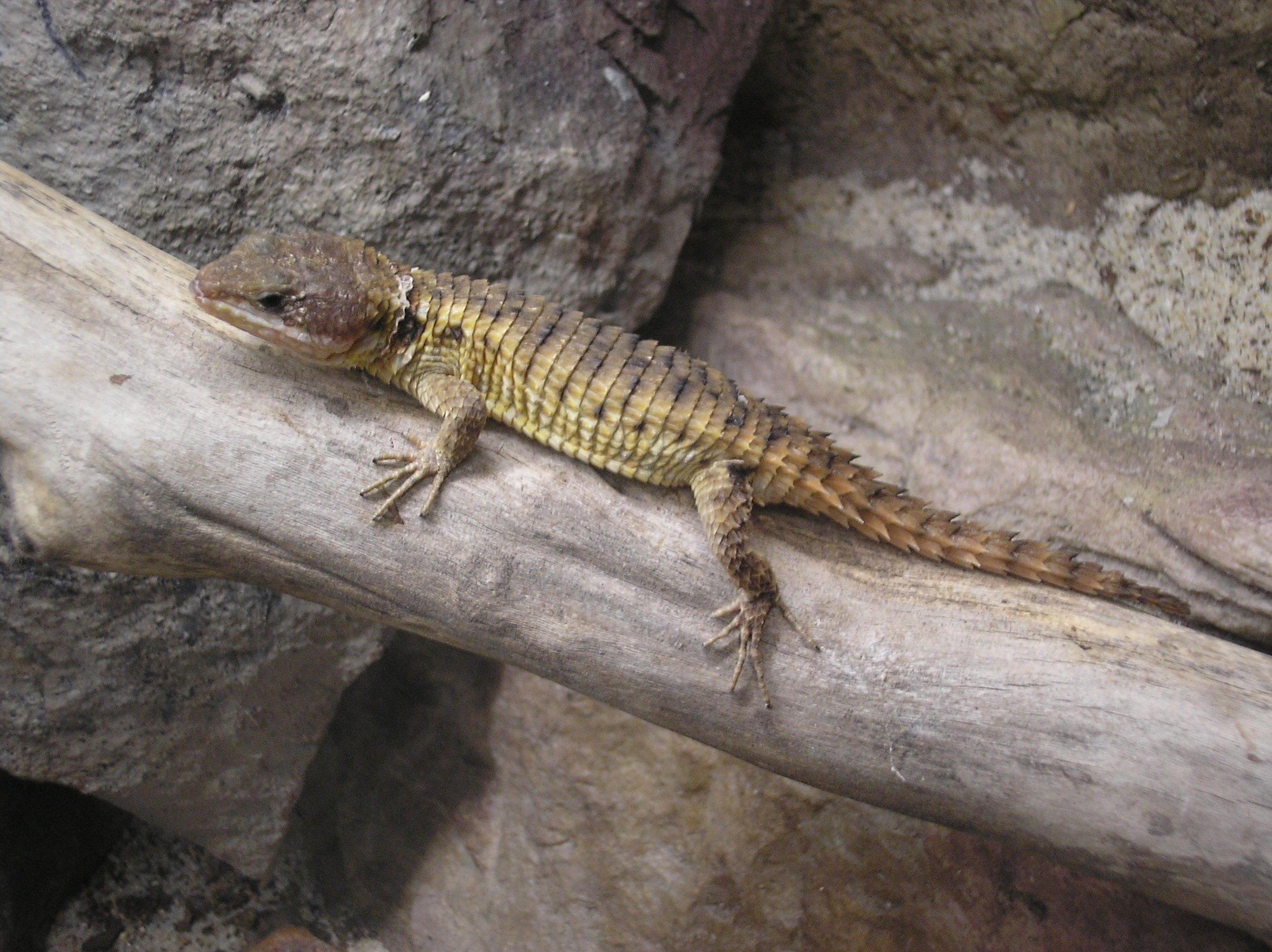

Conservation status
- Least Concern (IUCN 3.1)

Scientific classification
- Kingdom: Animalia
- Phylum: Chordata
- Class: Reptilia
- Order: Squamata
- Family: Cordylidae
- Genus: Cordylus
- Species: C. tropidosternum

Binomial name
- Cordylus tropidosternum (Cope, 1869)

Synonyms
- Zonurus tropidosternum Cope, 1869; Zonurus parkeri Cott, 1934; Cordylus tropidosternum — V. FitzSimons, 1943

= East African spiny-tailed lizard =

East African armadillo lizard

Species of lizard

The East African armadillo lizard, dwarf sungazer, or tropical girdled lizard (Cordylus tropidosternum) is a species of arboreal or rupicolous (rock-dwelling) lizard endemic to East Africa.

== Habitat ==
The preferred habitat of the East African armadillo lizard is dry forests.

== Geographic range ==
C. tropidosternum ranges from the southern Kenya through Tanzania and Malawi to southern Democratic Republic of the Congo, Zambia, northeast Zimbabwe and Mozambique.

== Behavior ==
Dwarf sungazers are diurnal. They lay down fat reserves in preparation for the dry season.

== Description ==
Tropical girdled lizards are brown above with dark brown and cream spots or thin dark bands. A conspicuous black stripe runs along each side of the neck from the ear to the shoulder. The lips, throat, and belly are cream. The tail is very spiny. Adults are 160–190 mm (6.3–7.5 in) in total length (including tail). Males have slightly wider heads than females (The length of a male's head is about 1.25 times the width, whereas the length of a female's head is about 1.33 times the width.) and are aggressive toward other males of the same species. Both sexes have femoral pores.

Tropical girdled lizards are almost identical to the Limpopo girdled lizard (Cordylus jonesii) and the Ukinga girdled lizard (Cordylus ukingensis). Limpopo girdled lizards have smooth scales on the throat and belly (C. tropidosternum has keeled scales) and its nostril is in the center of the nasal scale (the nostril of C. tropidosternum is positioned in the lower posterior corner of the nasal scale). The Ukinga girdled lizard has distinctive white lips, a small ridge over each eye (supraocular ridge), and the loreal scale is fused with the preocular scale (they are separate in C. tropidosternum and C. jonesii ).

== As pets ==
The tropical girdled lizard is exported from Tanzania and Mozambique for the pet trade where it is commonly referred to as the "armadillo lizard" or "forest armadillo lizard or "Jones's armadillo lizard". Tropical girdled lizards are not flattened like the true armadillo lizard (Ouroboros cataphractus) and do not grasp their tail and roll into a ball for defense. With gentle handling and plenty of hiding places, tropical girdled lizards become excellent, long-lived pets and can be trained to accept food from their owner's hand.

== Diet ==
As pets they are insectivores and can eat crickets, meal worms, phoenix worms, and occasionally wax worms.

== Breeding ==
They give birth to 1–6 live young.
