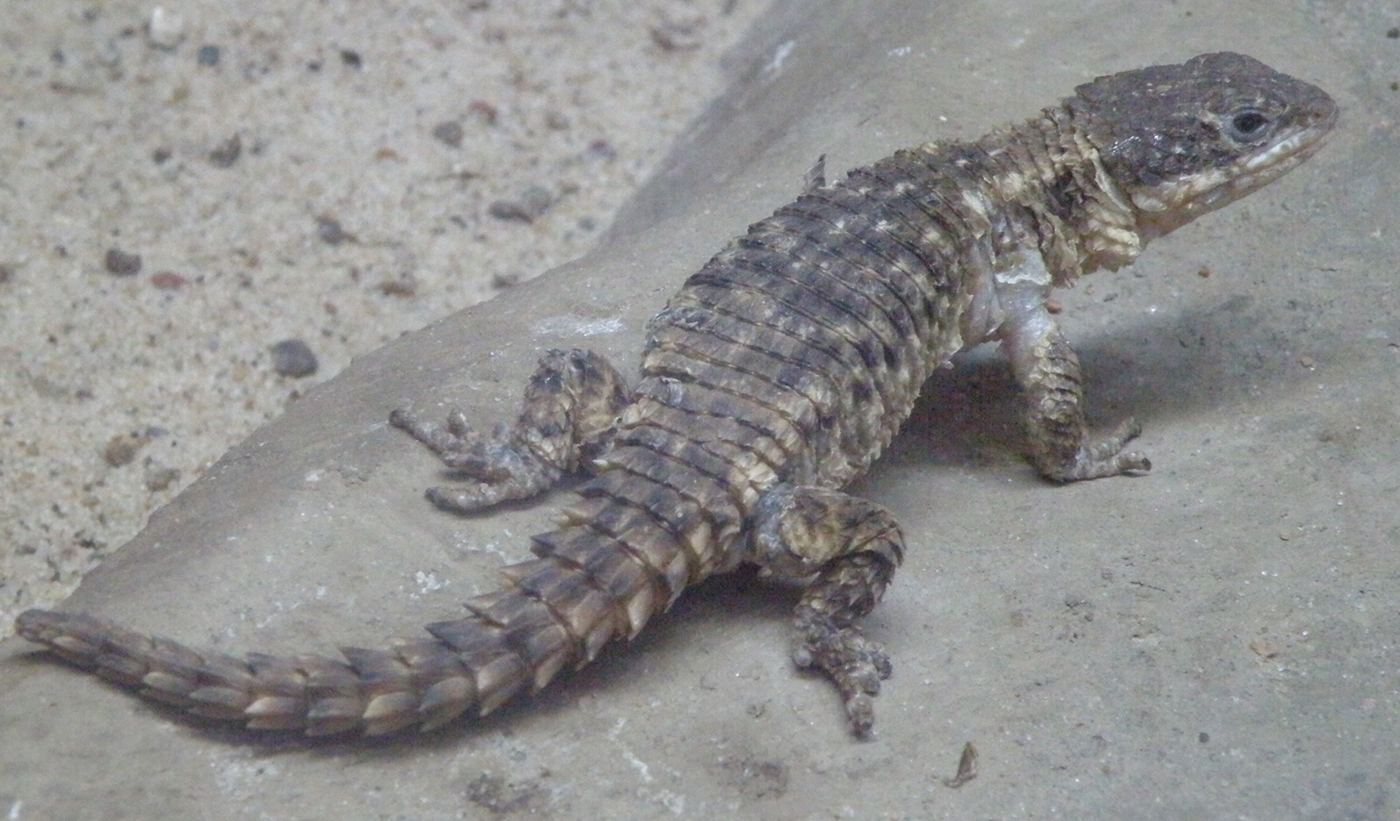

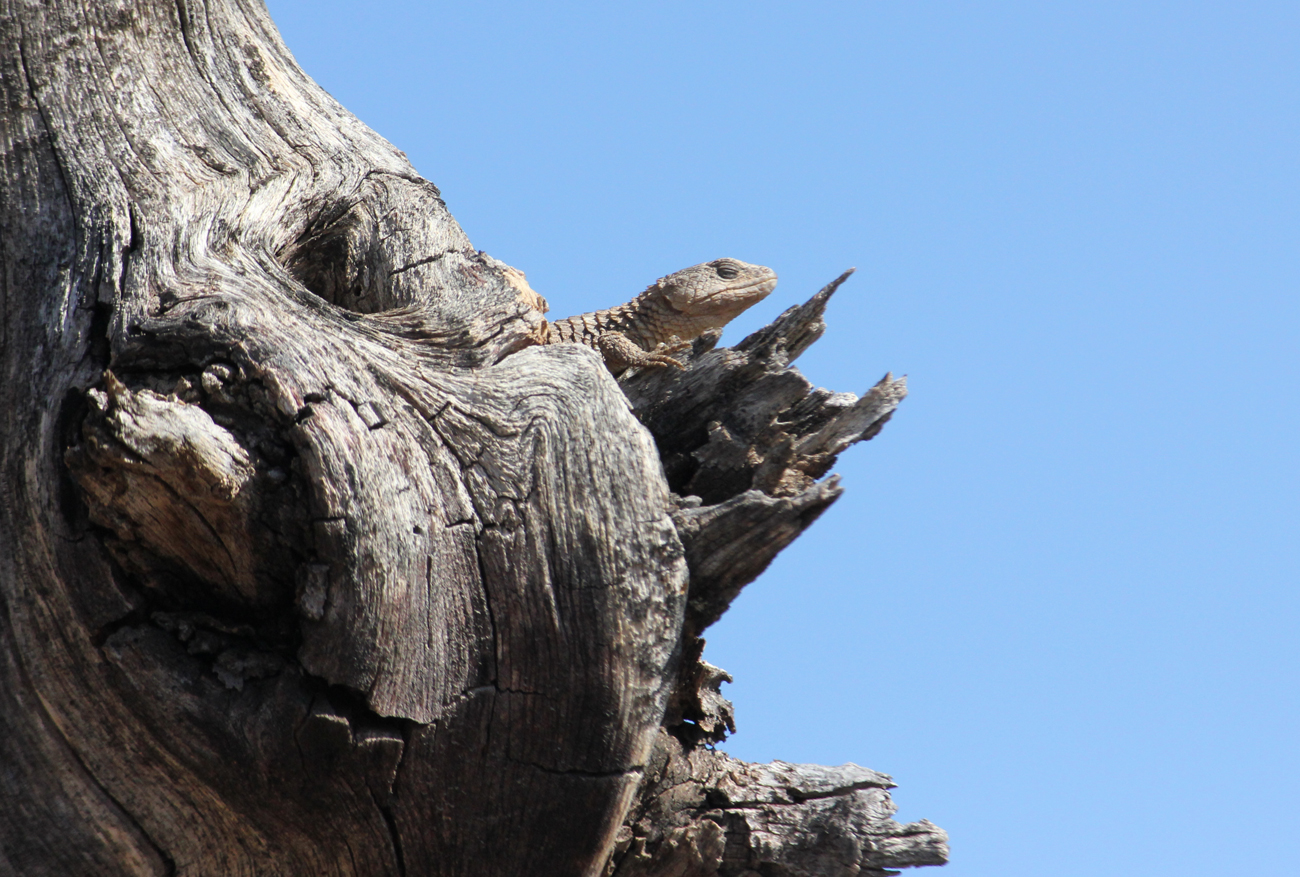

Conservation status
- Least Concern (IUCN 3.1)

Scientific classification
- Kingdom: Animalia
- Phylum: Chordata
- Class: Reptilia
- Order: Squamata
- Family: Cordylidae
- Genus: Cordylus
- Species: C. jonesii

Binomial name
- Cordylus jonesii (Boulenger, 1891)

Synonyms
- Zonurus jonesii Boulenger, 1891; Zonurus cordylus jonesii — Power, 1930; Cordylus jonesii V. FitzSimons, 1943; Cordylus cordylus jonesii — Loveridge, 1944; Cordylus tropidosternum jonesii — Auerbach, 1987; Cordylus jonesii — Broadley & Branch, 2002

= Limpopo girdled lizard =

Species of lizard

The Limpopo girdled lizard (Cordylus jonesii), also known commonly as Jones's armadillo lizard and Jones's girdled lizard, is a species of lizard in the family Cordylidae. The species is indigenous to Southern Africa.

== Etymology ==
The specific name, jonesii, is in honor of a "Mr. C. R. Jones" who collected the holotype. The common name, Limpopo girdled lizard, refers to the type locality, which is the Murchison Range in Limpopo.

== Geographic distribution ==
Cordylus jonesii is found on both sides of South Africa's border with Botswana, Zimbabwe, and Mozambique.

== Habitat and behavior ==
The Limpopo girdled lizard is arboreal and inhabits dry forests, especially mopane woodland, where it hides under loose bark and in hollow tree limbs.

== Diet ==
Cordylus jonesii preys upon winged termites, ants, and moths.

== Reproduction ==
Cordylus jonesii is ovoviviparous. Litter size is usually two young, but may be as many as four.

== Description ==
The dorsal pattern of Cordylus jonesii varies from red to brown to gray, with dark spots or lines. On some individuals, the lines fuse into a black-bordered white stripe along the midline of the back. The Limpopo girdled lizard has a distinct dark dorsolateral stripe running from the head to the hips. The belly, throat, and lips are cream to yellow. The tail is very spiny and about 45% the total length of the animal. Adults usually have a snout-to-vent length (SVL) of 6.0–7.5 cm (2.4–3.0 in).

== Taxonomy ==
The Limpopo girdled lizard is sometimes classified as a subspecies of the tropical girdled lizard (Cordylus tropidosternum). When both species are held together, the Limpopo girdled lizard has a noticeably shorter snout. In C. jonesii the nostril pierces the center of the nasal scale (the lower posterior corner of the nasal in C. tropidosternum). All of the ventral scales on the throat and belly of C. jonesii are smooth instead of keeled. C. jonesii is exported from Mozambique for the pet trade, where it is often mislabeled as Cordylus vittifer.
