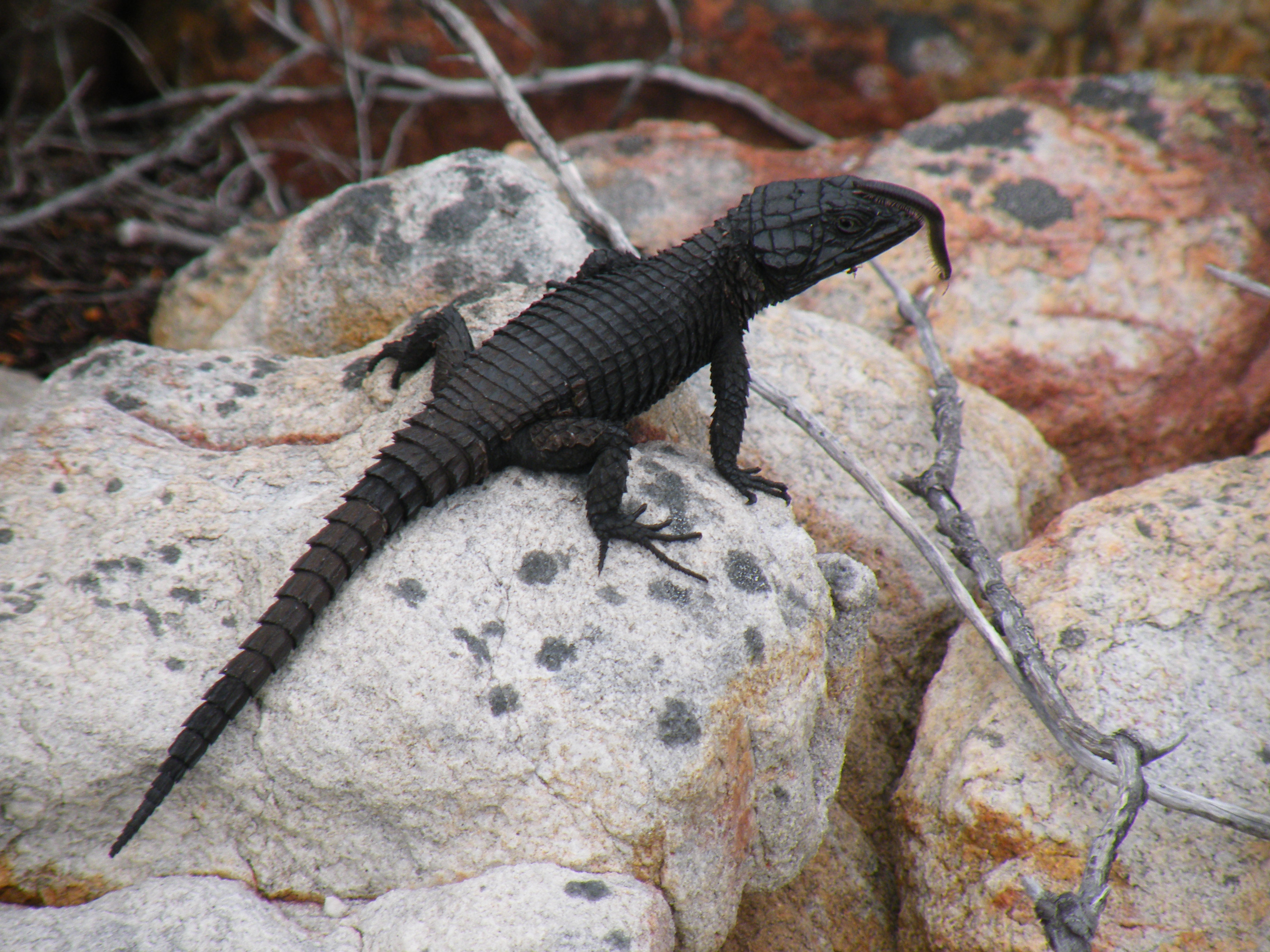
- A black girdled lizard on Table Mountain (with a millipede on its nose)

Conservation status
- Least Concern (IUCN 3.1)

Scientific classification
- Kingdom: Animalia
- Phylum: Chordata
- Class: Reptilia
- Order: Squamata
- Suborder: Scinciformata
- Infraorder: Scincomorpha
- Family: Cordylidae
- Genus: Cordylus
- Species: C. niger

Binomial name
- Cordylus niger Smith, 1844

= Cordylus niger =

Black girdled lizard

Species of lizard

Cordylus niger, the black girdled lizard, is a medium-sized lizard restricted to Table Mountain on the Cape Peninsula and a second, isolated population near Langebaan.

Black girdled lizards inhabit rocky outcrops on Table Mountain, South Africa. Unlike many other lizard species in the area, these particular Cordylus lizards are not social and are usually seen alone. They are spiny, flat, and pitch black in colour.

Their colour helps these unique lizards to absorb sufficient heat from the sun, in what is one of the darkest, least sunny parts of South Africa.

== Gallery ==
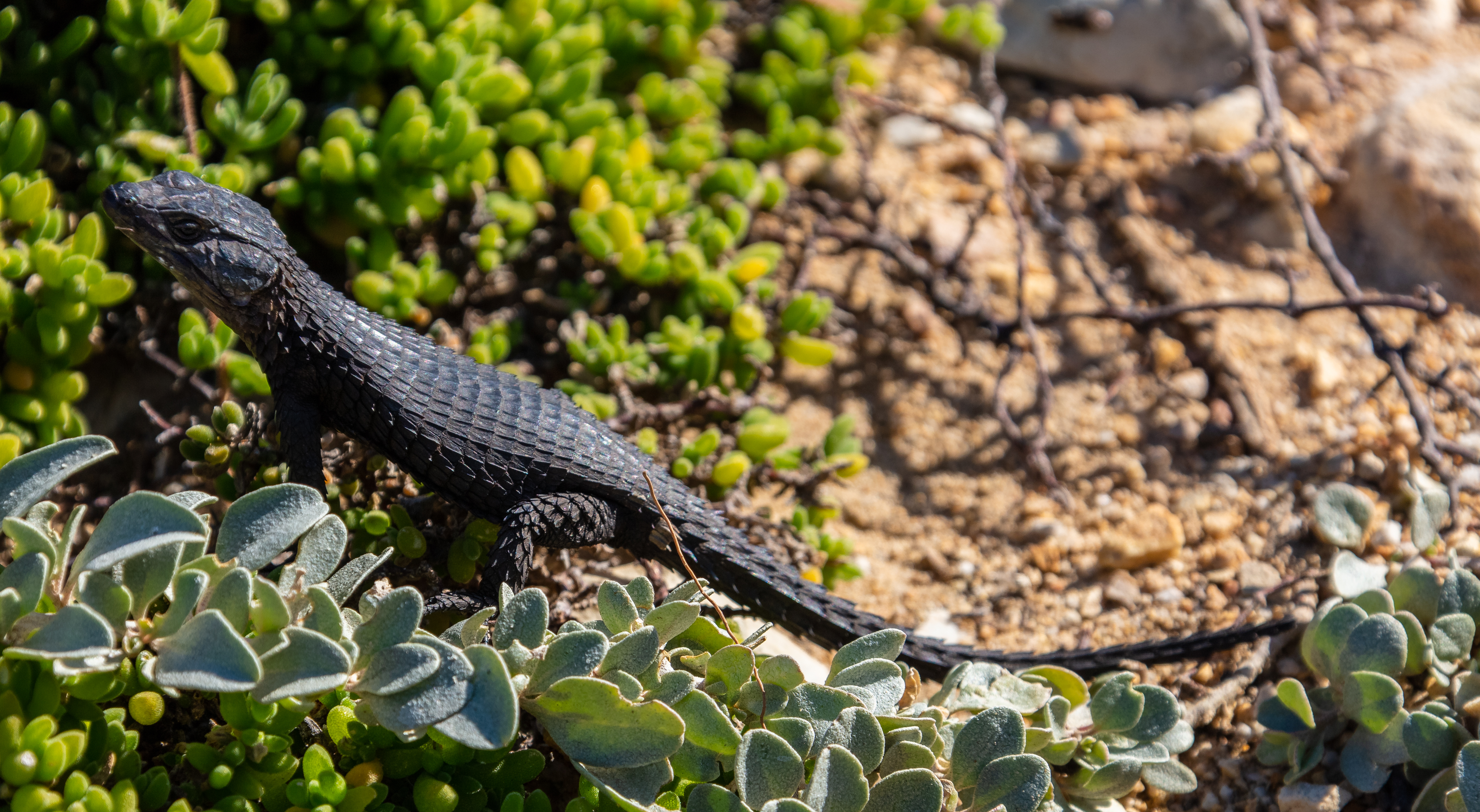
Black girdled lizard, Cape of Good Hope

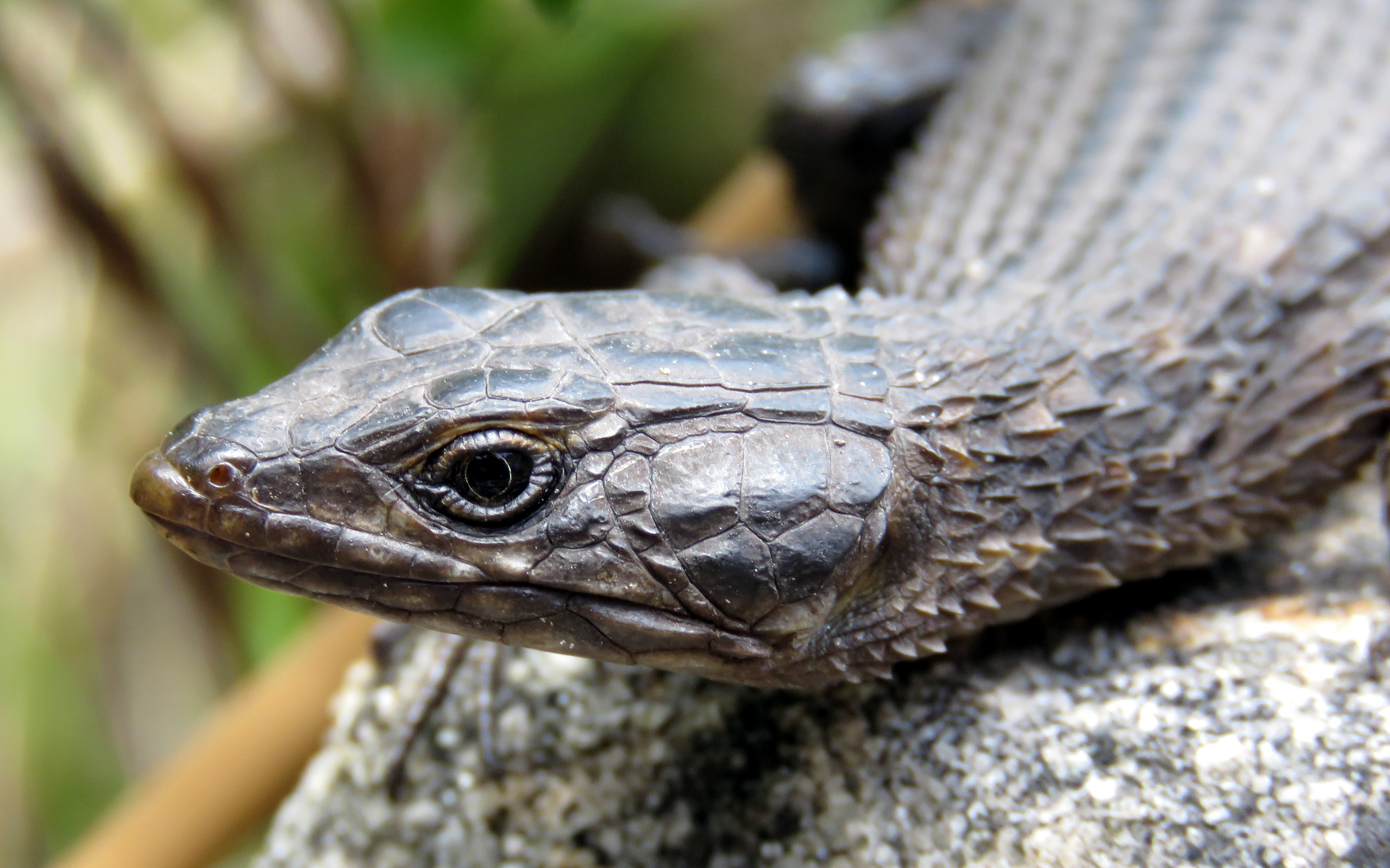
Close up of the head of a black girdled lizard

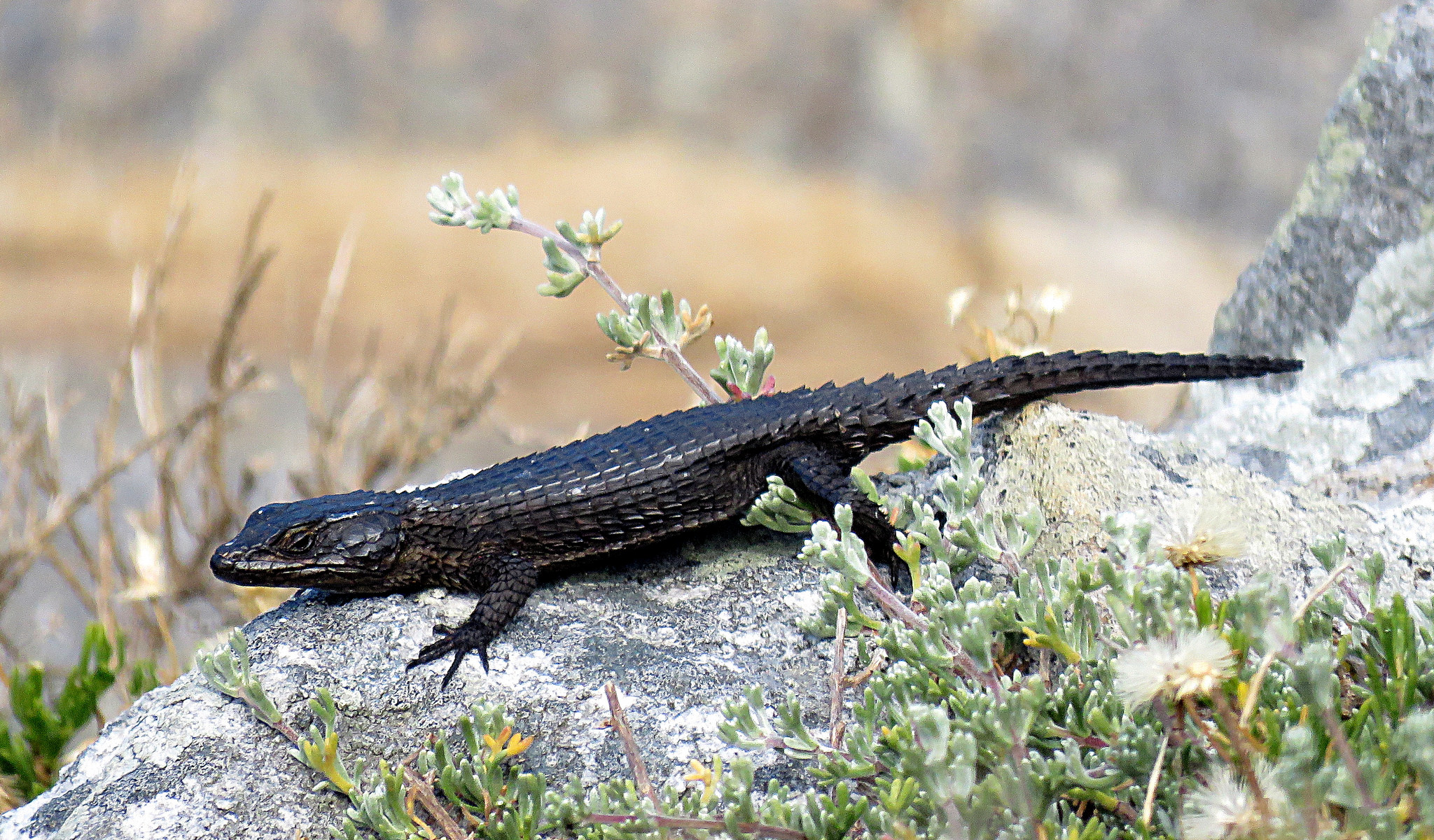
Black girdled lizard on a rock, Table Mountain.
