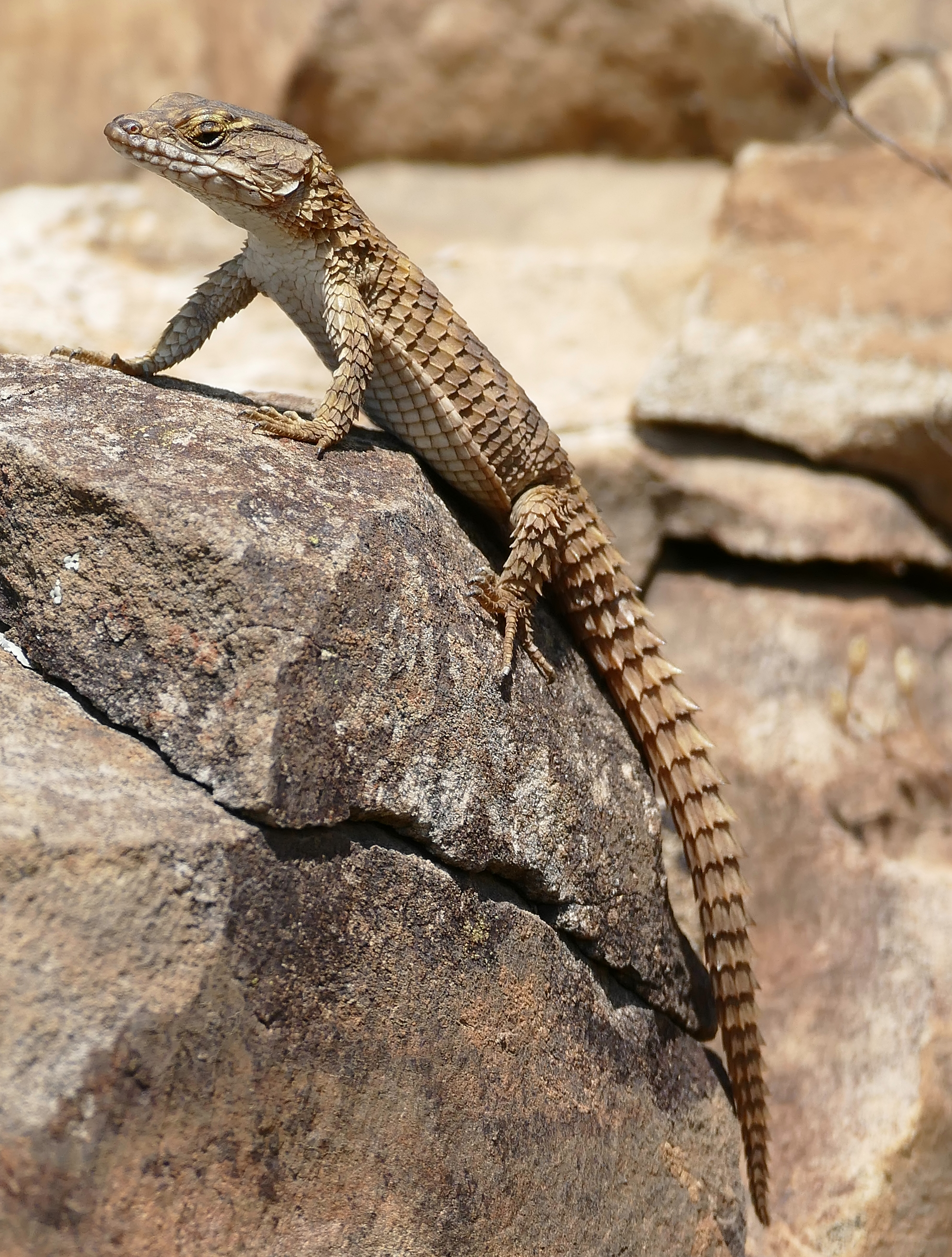
- At Mountain Zebra N.P., Eastern Cape

Conservation status
- Least Concern (IUCN 3.1)

Scientific classification
- Kingdom: Animalia
- Phylum: Chordata
- Class: Reptilia
- Order: Squamata
- Suborder: Scinciformata
- Infraorder: Scincomorpha
- Family: Cordylidae
- Genus: Cordylus
- Species: C. cordylus

Binomial name
- Cordylus cordylus Linnaeus, 1758

= Cordylus cordylus =

Cape girdled lizard

Species of lizard

Cordylus cordylus, the Cape girdled lizard, is a medium-sized lizard indigenous to the southern Cape region of South Africa, where it inhabits crags, rocky outcrops and mountain summits. They evade predators by wedging themselves firmly in rock cracks.

== Description ==
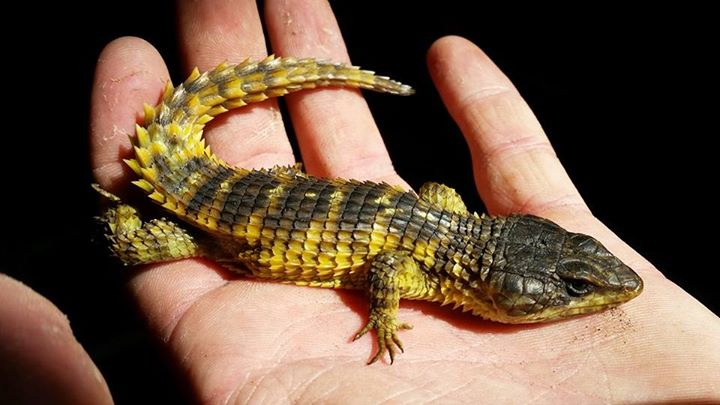
Specimen from the Western Cape

The Cape girdled lizard has a golden-brown body with spiny, keeled body scales, especially on its tail.

== Range ==
It is indigenous to the Western and Eastern Cape provinces of South Africa, from Saldanha and Cape Town eastwards as far as Lesotho.

== Food ==
They feed on insects, which are caught by rushing and pouncing.

== Habits ==
They live in large colonies (with social hierarchies) on crags, rocky outcrops and mountain summits. They can often be seen sunbathing on top of prominent rocks. The lizards hide in rocky cracks, but come out in the morning and evening to forage. If threatened, they retreat to their holes and cracks in the rocks, wedge themselves in and lock their bodies there by inflating their lungs. Jammed into the cracks like this, with their thorny tail wrapped protectively over their faces, they are incredibly difficult to prise out.

== Reproduction ==
In the autumn, the females give birth to one or two young, which stay very near the mother for the first year.
