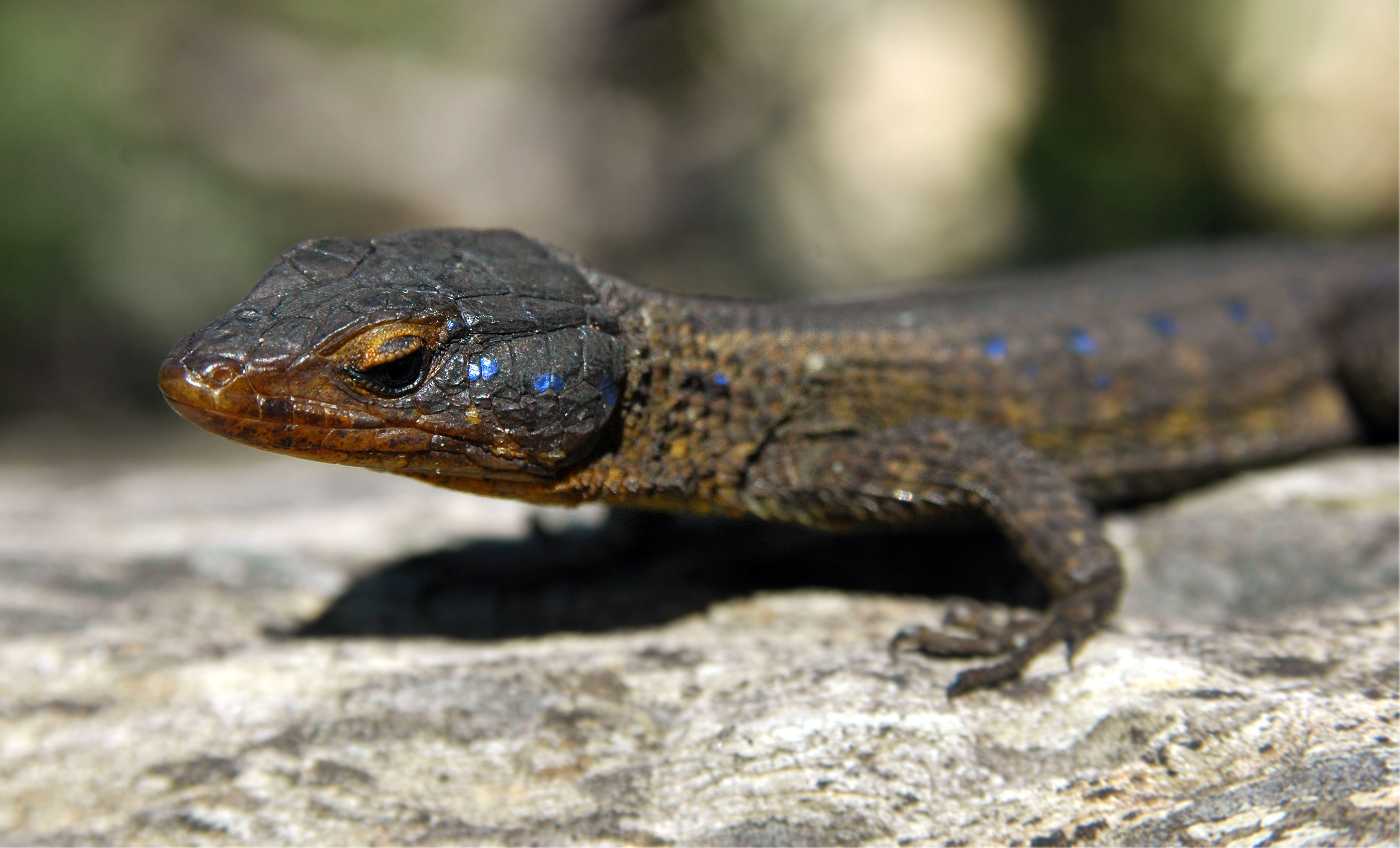
- At Nature's Valley, South Africa

Conservation status
- Least Concern (IUCN 3.1)

Scientific classification
- Kingdom: Animalia
- Phylum: Chordata
- Class: Reptilia
- Order: Squamata
- Family: Cordylidae
- Genus: Ninurta; Stanley, Bauer, Jackman, Branch, & Mouton, 2011
- Species: N. coeruleopunctatus

Binomial name
- Ninurta coeruleopunctatus (Methuen & Hewitt, 1913)

Synonyms
- Zonurus coeruleopunctatus Hewitt and Methuen, 1913; Cordylus coeruleopunctatus (Hewitt and Methuen, 1913)

= Ninurta coeruleopunctatus =

Species of lizard from South Africa

Ninurta coeruleopunctatus (syn. Cordylus coeruleopunctatus), the blue-spotted girdled lizard or simply blue-spotted lizard, is a monotypic genus that is endemic to southern, coastal South Africa. The Ninurta coeruleopunctatus, as a member of the Cordylinae subfamily, demonstrates significant variability in body armor. This variation is a cause of the diverse evolutionary pressures within the subfamily. The environments aridity is the significant cause for this body armour's evolution.
