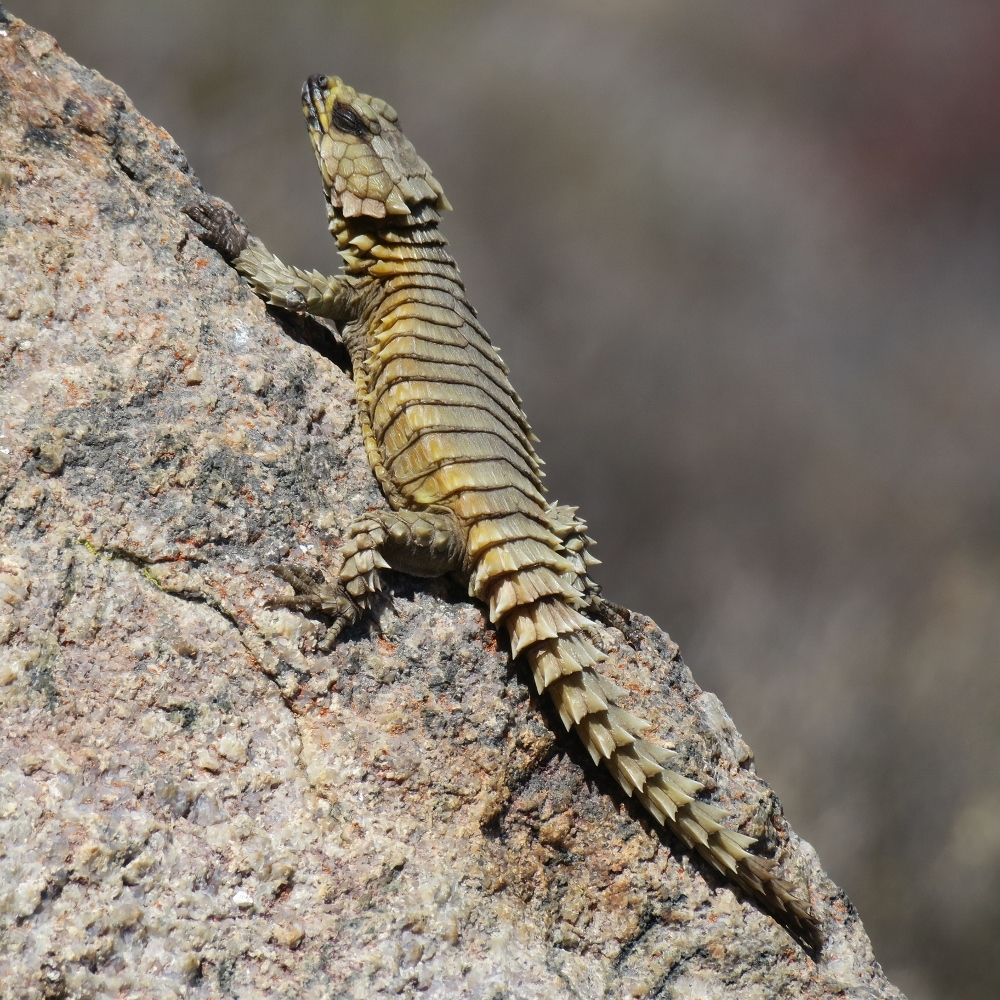
- Namakwa, Northern Cape, South Africa

Conservation status
- Near Threatened (IUCN 3.1)

Scientific classification
- Kingdom: Animalia
- Phylum: Chordata
- Class: Reptilia
- Order: Squamata
- Family: Cordylidae
- Genus: Ouroborus; Stanley, Bauer, Jackman, Branch & Mouton, 2011
- Species: O. cataphractus

Binomial name
- Ouroborus cataphractus (F. Boie, 1828)
- IUCN range as of 2021

Synonyms
- Cordylus cataphractus F. Boie, 1828; Zonurus cataphractus Gray, 1831; Cordylus nebulosus A. Smith, 1838; Zonurus cataphractus A.M.C. Duméril & Bibron, 1839; Ouroborus cataphractus Stanley et al., 2011

= Armadillo girdled lizard =

Species of reptile

The armadillo girdled lizard (Ouroborus cataphractus), also commonly known as the armadillo lizard, the armadillo spiny-tailed lizard, and the golden-armadillo lizard, is a species of lizard in the family Cordylidae. The species is endemic to desert areas along the western coast of South Africa. In 2011, it was moved to its own genus based on molecular phylogeny, but formerly it was included in the genus Cordylus. It has the largest known genome of all squamates.

== Description ==
The armadillo girdled lizard is light brown to dark brown in colouration. The underbelly is yellow with a blackish pattern, especially under the chin. Its size can range from 7.5 to 9 cm (3.0 to 3.5 in) in snout-vent length (SVL). It may grow to a maximum size of 8 in (20 cm) STL.

== Distribution and habitat ==
O. cataphractus is endemic to the Succulent Karoo biome in the Northern and the Western Cape provinces of South Africa, where it occurs from the southern Richtersveld to the Piketberg Mountains and the southern Tankwa Karoo National Park. It inhabits rock outcrops mountain slopes, preferably on sandstone substrate.

== Ecology ==
=== Diet ===
The armadillo girdled lizard feeds mainly on small invertebrates, such as insects and spiders, but sometimes also may take plant material. In captivity, it is commonly fed crickets. In the wild, its most common prey items are termites, especially Microhodotermes viator and Hodotermes mossambicus, as well as beetles, millipedes, and scorpions. Individuals in larger social groups tend to eat more termites than those in smaller groups.

=== Behaviour ===
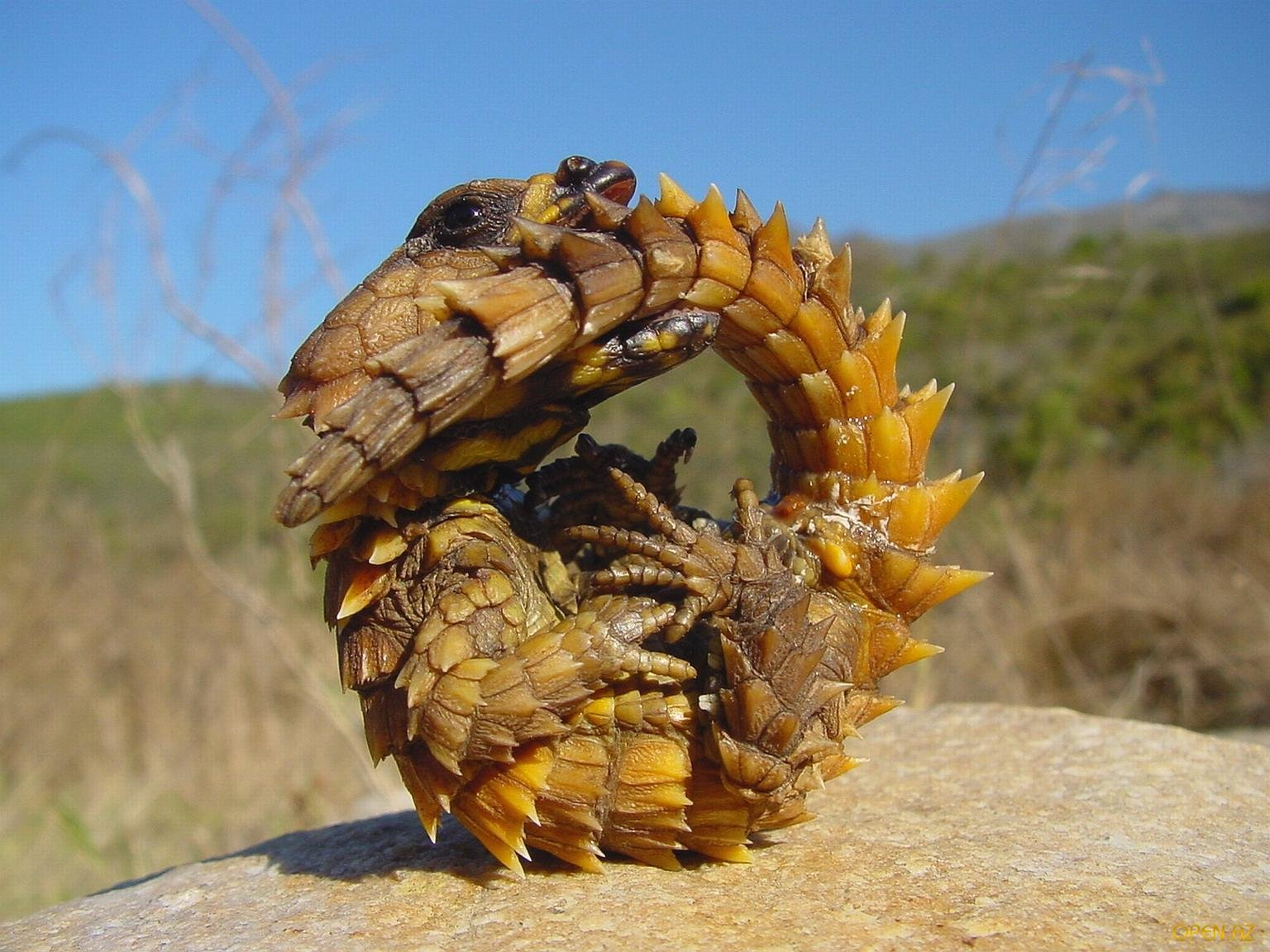
In its defensive position, the armadillo girdled lizard resembles an Ouroboros.

The armadillo girdled lizard is diurnal. It hides in rock cracks and crevices. It lives in social groups of up to 30 to 60 individuals of all ages, but usually fewer. Males are territorial, protecting a territory and mating with the females living there.

The armadillo girdled lizard possesses an uncommon anti-predator adaptation in which it rolls into a ball and takes its tail in its mouth when frightened. In this shape, it is protected by the thick, squarish scales on its back and the spines on its tail. This behaviour, which resembles that of the mythical ouroboros and the mammalian armadillo, gives the lizard its taxonomic and English common names.

=== Reproduction ===
The female armadillo girdled lizard gives birth to one or two live young; the species is one of the few lizards that does not lay eggs. The female may even feed her young, which is also unusual for a lizard. Females give birth once a year at most; some take a year off between births.

One hundred and six individuals from 27 groups were marked and recaptured regularly from May until September 2002. The group that was greater in fidelity had a greater neighbouring distance, while the group that was less in fidelity had a less neighbouring distance. The neighbouring distance correlates to the fidelity of the armadillo girdled lizard species.

Males follow either a prenuptial or postnuptial reproductive cycle. The more common cycle is prenuptial with high sperm count being in the fall and winter seasons. In the postnuptial cycle, males produce the most sperm in the late summer season.

== Conservation ==
The species Ouroborus cataphractus is classified by the IUCN as near threatened. This is mostly due to a general cessation of collection for the pet trade, which was a significant drain on populations but is now illegal. The armadillo girdled lizard is thought to be somewhat susceptible to fluctuations in its primary food source (termites), which in turn can be impacted by climatic events such as changes in rainfall patterns, as well as to habitat changes through invasive alien plant species and poor fire management.
