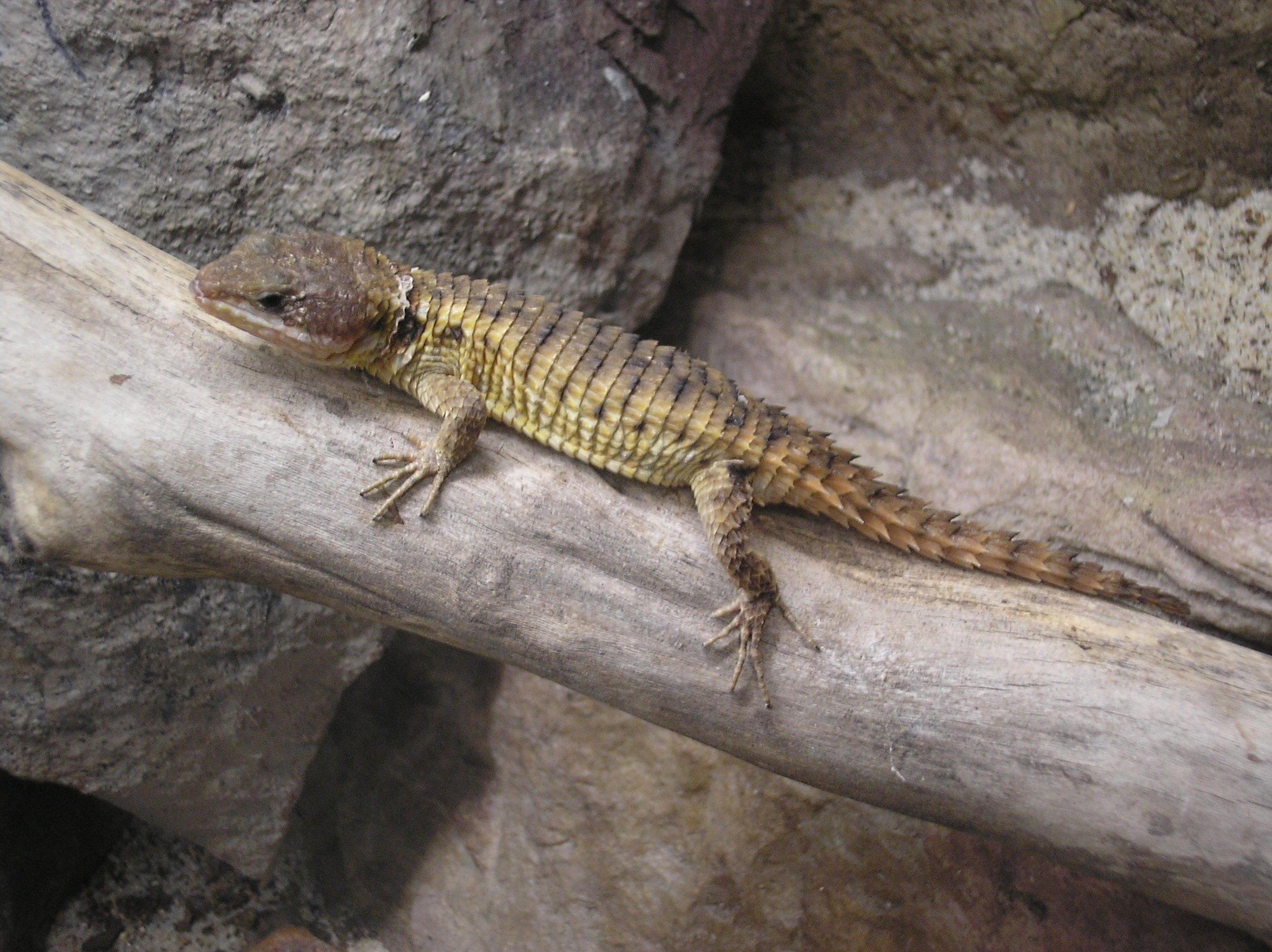
- Tropical girdled lizard, Cordylus tropidosternum

Scientific classification
- Kingdom: Animalia
- Phylum: Chordata
- Class: Reptilia
- Order: Squamata
- Clade: Cordyliformes
- Family: Cordylidae; Fitzinger, 1826

Diversity
- 10 genera (see text)

= Cordylidae =

Family of lizards

Cordylidae is a family of small- to medium-sized lizards that occur in southern and eastern Africa. They are commonly known as girdled lizards, spinytail lizards, or girdle-tail lizards.

Cordylidae is closely related to the family Gerrhosauridae, occurring in Africa and Madagascar. These two scientific families of lizards, known as Cordyliformes or Cordyloidea, are sometimes combined into a larger concept of Cordylidae. Recent molecular analyses confirm the clade made up of Cordylidae and Gerrhosauridae (Cordyloidea) and place it in a larger clade including Xantusiidae (Cordylomorpha Vidal & Hedges, 2009).

== Description and behavior ==
Girdled lizards are diurnal and insectivorous. They are terrestrial, mostly inhabiting crevices in rocky terrain, although at least one species digs burrows and another lives under exfoliating bark on trees. They have flattened heads and bodies, and are distinguished by a heavy armour of osteoderms and large, rectangular, scales, arranged in regular rows around the body and tail. Many species have rings of spines on the tail, that aid in wedging the animal into sheltering crevices, and also in dissuading predators.

Most species have four limbs, but those in the genus Chamaesaura are almost entirely limbless, with only tiny spikes in place of the hind limbs. The family includes both egg-laying and ovoviviparous species.

== Genera ==
List of genera
Genus	Image	Type species	Taxon author	Common name	Species
Chamaesaura	C. anguina	C. anguina (Linnaeus, 1758)	Schneider, 1801	Grass lizards	5
Cordylus	C. niger	C. cordylus (Linnaeus, 1758)	Laurenti, 1768	Girdled lizards	21
Hemicordylus	H. capensis	H. capensis (Smith, 1838)	Smith, 1838	Cliff lizards	2
Karusasaurus	K. polyzonus	K. polyzonus (Smith, 1838)	Stanley, Bauer, Jackman, Branch & Mouton, 2011	Karusa lizards	2
Namazonurus	N. peersi	N. pustulatus (W. Peters, 1862)	Stanley, Bauer, Jackman, Branch & Mouton, 2011	Namaqua girdled lizards	5
Ninurta	N. coeruleopunctatus	N. coeruleopunctatus (Methuen & Hewitt, 1913)	Stanley, Bauer, Jackman, Branch & Mouton, 2011	Blue-spotted girdled lizard	1
Ouroborus	O. cataphractus	O. cataphractus (F. Boie, 1828)	Stanley, Bauer, Jackman, Branch & Mouton, 2011	Armadillo girdled lizard	1
Platysaurus	P. relictus	P. capensis Smith, 1844	Smith, 1844	Flat lizards	16
Pseudocordylus	P. subviridis	P. microlepidotus (Cuvier, 1829)	Smith, 1838	Crag lizards	6
Smaug	S. giganteus	S. giganteus (Smith, 1844)	Stanley, Bauer, Jackman, Branch & Mouton, 2011	Girdled lizards	9
