= List of rivers of Mozambique =

This is a list of rivers in Mozambique. This list is arranged by drainage basin, with respective tributaries indented under each larger stream's name.

== Indian Ocean ==
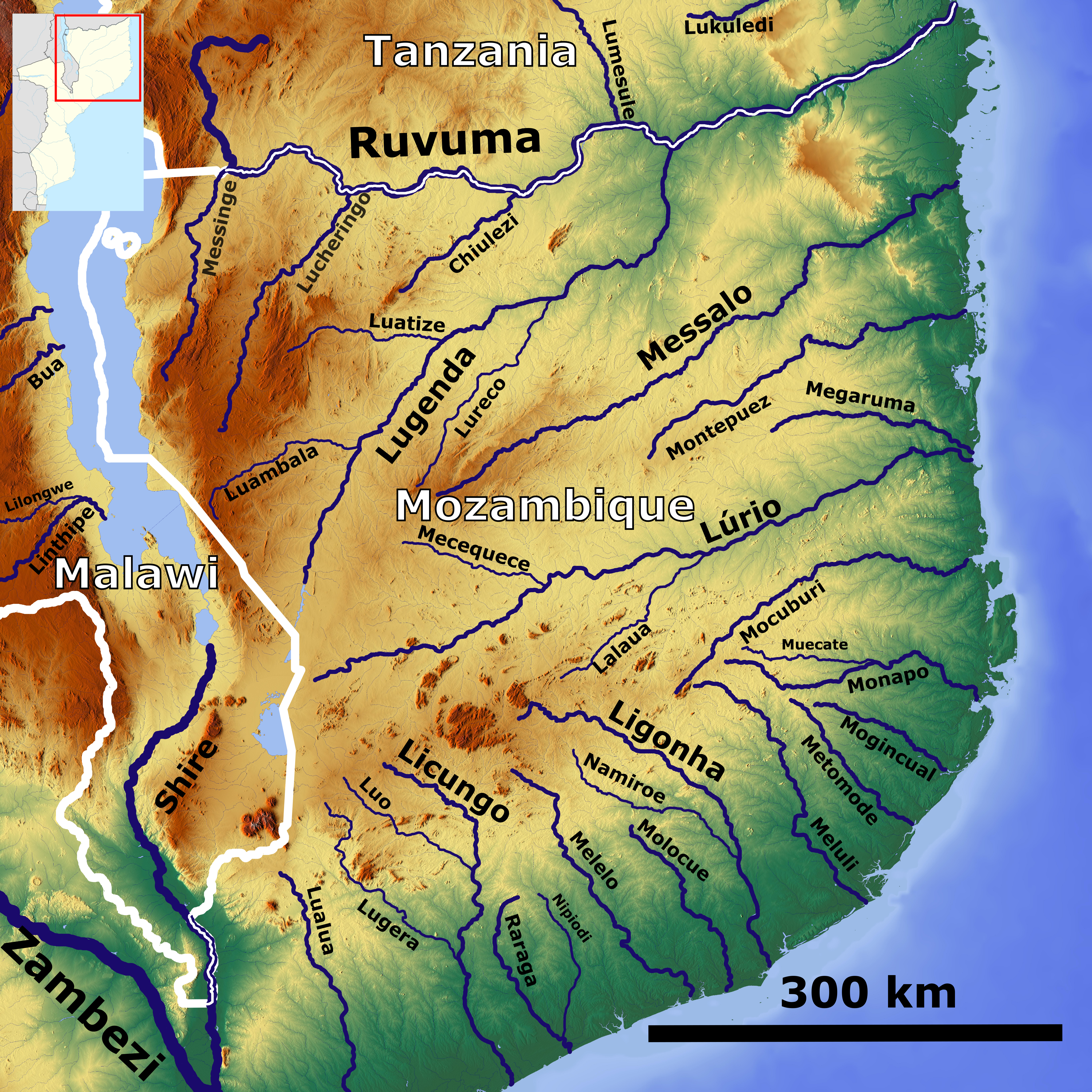
Rivers of the northern part of Mozambique

- Ruvuma River
  - Lugenda River
    - Lureco River
    - Luatize River
    - Lotchese River
    - Luambala River
    - Luchimua River
    - Mandimbe River
      - Ngalamu River
  - Chiulezi River
  - Luchulingo River
  - Messinge River (Msinje River)
- Messalo River
- Montepuez River
- Lúrio River
- Mecuburi River
- Sanhute River
- Monapo River
- Mugincual River
- Melúli River
- Ligonha River
- Melela River
- Raraga River
- Licungo River
- Cuácua River (Rio dos Bons Sinais) (Quelimane River)
  - Licuare River
  - Lualua River
- Mucarau River
- Zambezi River
  - Chinde River (distributary)
    - Inhaombe River
  - Zangue River
    - Nhamapasa River
  - Shire River
    - Lake Malawi
      - Msinje River
  - Pompué River
  - Luenha River
    - Mazowe River
      - Ruya River (Luia River)
    - Gairezi River (Cauresi River)
  - Revúboé River
  - Luia River
    - Cherisse River
    - Muangadeze River
    - Capoche River
  - Luangua River (Duangua River)
  - Mucanha River
  - Messenguézi River
  - Metamboa River
  - Manyame River (Panhame River) (Hunyani River)
    - Angwa River
  - Luangwa River
- Micelo River
- Mupa River
- Chinizíua River
- Sangussi River
- Pungwe River
  - Vunduzi River
- Buzi River
  - Revué River
  - Lucite River
- Gorongosa River
  - Muar River
- Save River (Sabi River)
- Govuro River
- Inharrime River
- Limpopo River
  - Changane River
  - Olifants River
    - Shingwidzi River
  - Mwenezi River
- Komati River (Incomati River)
  - Mazimechopes River
  - Nwanedzi River
  - Nwaswitsontso River
  - Sabie River
- Matola River
- Umbuluzi River River
- Tembe River
- Maputo River (Lusutfu River)
  - Pongola River
  - Tumbulumundo River
