= Negomano =

- Location within Mozambique
- Coordinates: 11°25′42″S 38°29′32″E
- Country: Mozambique
- Provinces: Cabo Delgado Province
- District: Mueda District

Negomano or Ngomano is a village in northern Mozambique, in Cabo Delgado Province. It is located on the border with Tanzania on the confluence of the Ruvuma River and the Lugenda River.

Negomano was the scene of fierce battle between the German Army and the Portuguese Army during World War I, in November/December 1917 when several hundred soldiers were killed (battle of Ngomano).

Development initiatives launched subsequent to civil war of 1992 has resulted in economic progress in Negomano, which is part of the Niassa Reserve. Further, a four country initiative of Malawi, Mozambique, the northern and eastern provinces of Zambia, and the southern regions of the United Republic of Tanzania) has resulted in the creation of the 720 metres (2,360 ft) long Unity Bridge across the Ruvuma River at Negomano.

== History ==
The Negomano area was occupied during the Early Iron Age by early hunter-gatherers. Modern tribes in the area can be traced to the southern shores of Lake Malawi who moved into the Rovuma River valley in the medieval period to escape severe drought.

Due to its strategical location, a military post was located at Negomano, which was in contact with the town of Meculu. During the Portuguese occupation, two expatriate officers were located in Negomano district to ensure that the local farmers met their quota of cotton production and complied with the standards set by the senior bureaucrats in the capital, Lourenco Marques (Maputo).

Germans who had colonial designs on Mozambique, particularly its northern region, by diplomatic coercion had obtained border concessions from Portugal by annexing the mouth of the Rovuma River and even established their commune at Quionga. This ambition got a boost during the World War I when they launched a full-scale war on Mozambique, which resulted in Portuguese getting defeated initially. However, with great investment of manpower and material, the Germans could be eventually defeated by the British and the Portuguese Army.

A battle took place at Negomano on November 25, 1917, between the Germans and the Portuguese during World War I. In the river valley and the Nissa Wild Life Preserve enclosed within it, German Army supported by Askaris, under the command of General Paul Erich von Lettow-Vorbeck, crossed the Ruvuma River at Negomano and entered the Portuguese held Mozambique in search of food for his troops. In December 1917, after crossing the river, the general with his army marched south along the Lugenda River and arrived at Metarica. One of the battalions dispatched towards the Mecula Mountain in search of food had to fight a fierce battle with the Portuguese who were led by Major João Teixeira Pinto. The Portuguese force was comprehensively defeated. Witness to this battle are seen in the form of a few graves on the hill slopes at Mecula, the district capital of Niassa. The Germans defeated a Portuguese force of some 1200 men at Negomano and seized valuable supplies, including 250,000 rounds, six machine guns and medicine. During this battle known as "Battle of Negomano", following the defeat of Portuguese Army by the German Army, 550 soldiers were taken prisoners.

Negomano was occupied during the war in 1976 when a mine exploded 10 kilometres (6.2 mi) from the village. Two soldiers were seriously wounded and had to be flown out by helicopter.

== Ethnicity and culture ==
The Makonde people are the largest ethnic group residing in the Cabo Delgado Province where the village of Negomano is located. Mekondes’ have a strong and unique culture known for wood and ivory carving. Ancestral customs of ritual tattooing and teeth filing are still practiced by them.

The historical Namachakole trench (Lilondo suburb) where the tombs of 11 Frelimo fighters killed in combat at Negomano are buried is a tourist attraction in Mueda district. The other attraction is of wild life safaris originating from Negomano.

== Ecology and community development ==
Following the end of civil war in 1992 in Mozambique, community conservation initiatives were launched involving local communities, NGOs, and private sector. One such initiative instituted by the Government of Mozambique was specific to the Niassa Reserve titled the “Niassa Reserve Community-Based Natural Resources Management (CBNRM),” which covered three villages within the reserve namely, Negomano, Mussoma and Naulala. Investment funds and expertise required over the period of project implementation were provided under a memorandum of understanding (MoU) signed in 2001 between the Sociedade para Gestão e Desenvolvimento da Reserva do Niassa (SGDRN) and WWF Southern Africa Regional Office (SARPO). The Norwegian Agency for Development and Cooperation (NORAD) funded the project, which was implemented by WWF Norway and the WWF SARPO, through WWF Mozambique in association with SGDRN, over the period from 2001 to 2005. This project has been reportedly assessed as successful in achieving the framework of defined objectives. The achievements reported are: Establishing community-based organizations; addressing the animal human conflicts issues through training and evolving suitable techniques for reducing such conflicts; creating better knowledge base to the staff operating the programmes with due regard to community sensitivities, develop income generating initiatives such as establishing honey and fishing user groups; appraising the community of the stated objectives of the project and creating a trust between the community and the administrators of the reserve.

== Transport ==
When David Livingstone had visited the area in 1858 it had ended his hopes of building a highway. However, a bridge, known as Unity Bridge has been built in the vicinity connecting Mozambique to Tanzania across the river Mourama. It is one of the development projects planned under the Mtwara Corridor Spatial Development Initiative.

This project titled “A new development corridor” as a four country initiative (to benefit Malawi, Mozambique, the northern and eastern provinces of Zambia, and the southern regions of the United Republic of Tanzania) in the heart of the Southern African Development Community (SADC) was launched in 2004 signed under a legal framework that should make the Mtwara Development Corridor a reality and improve the lives of the people who live in these four countries.

The initiative to build this bridge, across the Ruvuma River at Negomano, also known as the "Unity Bridge 1" began in 1975. However, a formal agreement between Tanzania and Mozambique was signed on October 10, 2005. The bridge, as designed by Norconsult, 750 m long, was finally completed in 2010. It was formally inaugurated on May 12, 2010, by the presidents of Mozambique and Tanzania. This bridge will be a forerunner for the projects planned under the Mtwara Corridor. It also reduces the distance along the Cape to Cairo Road.

The main place of entry into Negomano on the Mozambique side is via a dirt road to the south east, which connects to the nearest major town of Mueda, which is linked by air via Mueda Airport. The town of Lugenda is located down river to the southwest of Negomano. Negomano reportedly has one school of about 100 children and a small hospital.
