= Lureco River =

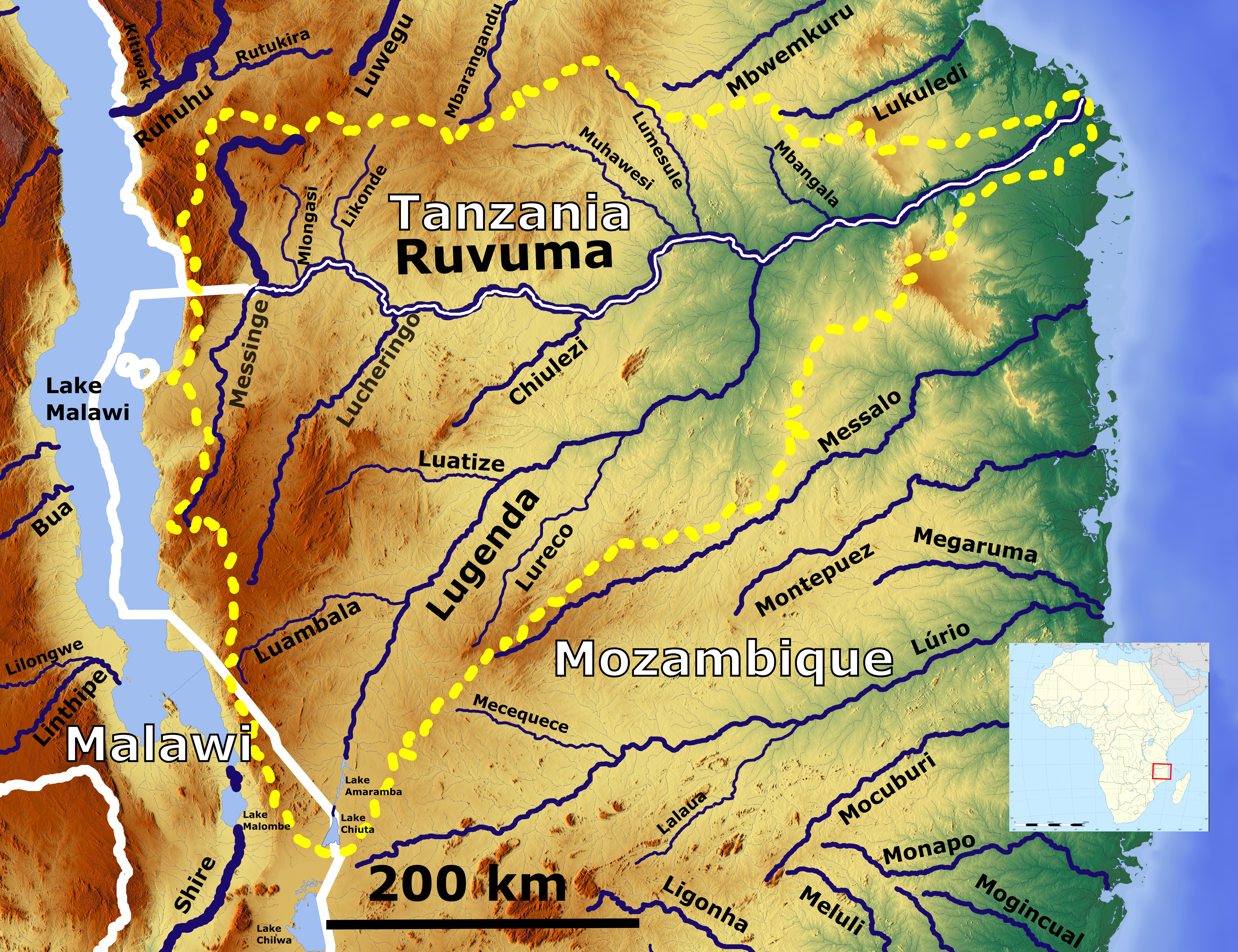
- Lureco River on map of Ruvuma River basin, appearing just below label for Lugenda

Location
- Country: Mozambique

Physical characteristics
- Mouth
  - location: Lugenda River
  - coordinates: 12°26′51″S 37°38′06″E
- Length: 57 km

Basin features
- River system: Ruvuma River

The Lureco River, previously also called the Rarico or Rureco, is a river in Mozambique. It is one of the primary tributaries of the Lugenda River, itself a tributary of the Ruvuma River. It runs through the Marrupa District of Niassa Province, with the majority of its length within the Niassa Reserve.

The river is 57 km in length and has a catchment area of 960 square km. About 30% of the upper reaches of the catchment area lay outside of the Niassa Reserve. A 2004 survey of rivers in the Niassa Reserve reports that the river's catchment area is primarily dominated by deciduous miombo (60%) and the remaining part containing deciduous dry miombo savanna woodland (10%). Near the confluence with the Lugenda, there is a high density of elephant. The survey reports two settlements in the catchment area of the river, Mpamanda and Mucovia.

During the Portuguese colonial era, a European expedition — operating on behalf of the Nyassa Company — discovered gold in the sandy riverbed and referred to it as the "Rarico" river. Some small scale gold mining activity is still reported to occur near the river.

In 2024, a large fish kill occurred on the river, suspected to be caused by local fishermen poisoning the fish to allow them to be collected and sold.
