= Congerenge =

- Location within Mozambique
- Coordinates: 14°12′29″S 35°55′4.5″E
- Country: Mozambique
- Provinces: Niassa Province

Congerenge is a small town in Niassa Province in northwestern Mozambique. It lies north of Lake Amaramba. The EN8 road connects the town to the city of Nampula in the southeast and Chiponde to the west in Malawi.
