= Lugenda River =

River in Northern Mozambique

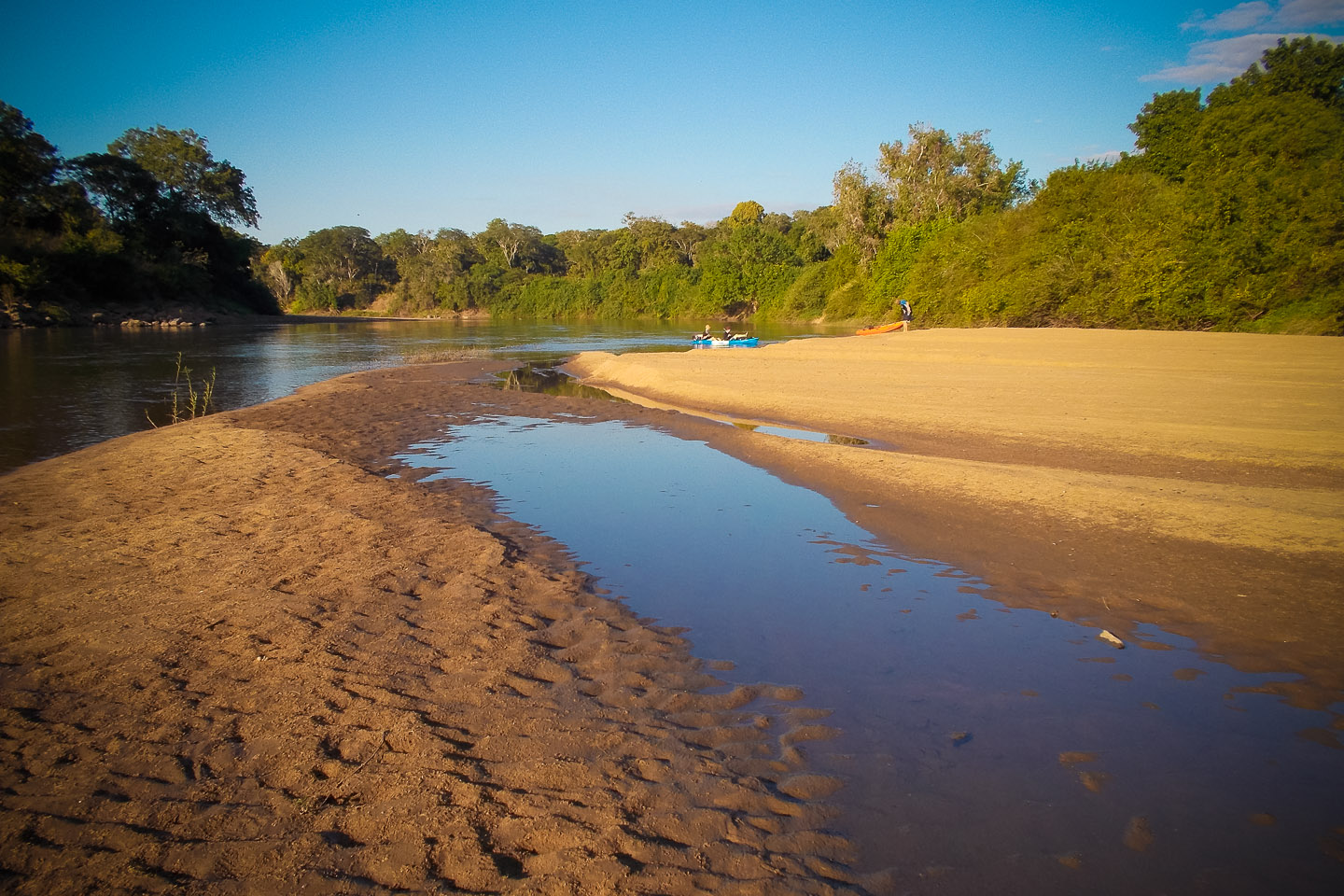

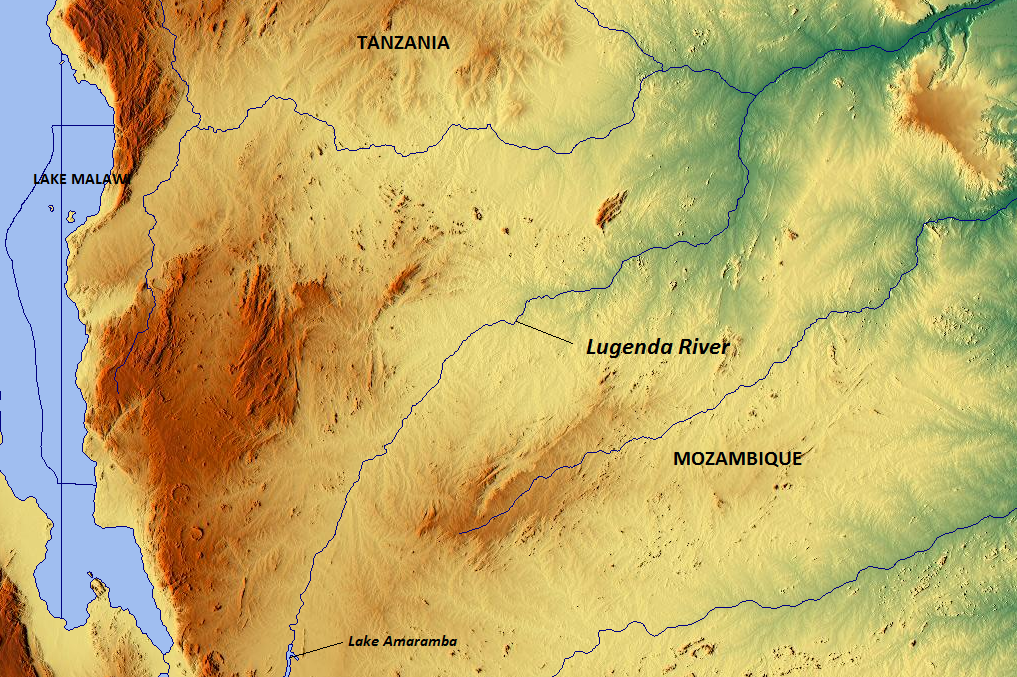

Location
- Country: Mozambique

Physical characteristics
- Source
  - location: Lake Amaramba
- Mouth
  - location: Ruvuma River
  - coordinates: 11°25′26″S 38°29′06″E

Basin features
- River system: Ruvuma River

The Lugenda or Lujenda (alternate: Msambiti River) is a river of northern Mozambique. It flows in a south-north direction from Lake Amaramba/Lake Chiuta and is the largest tributary of the Ruvuma River. It joins the Luambala River at 13°26′12″S 36°18′20″E. The river valley is reported to be only 800 feet (240 m) above sea level. North of Lake Chiuta, those on the west bank call it the Msambiti River. At one point, the Lugenda splits into several streams with islands between them, some of whom are populated such as the island Achemponda.

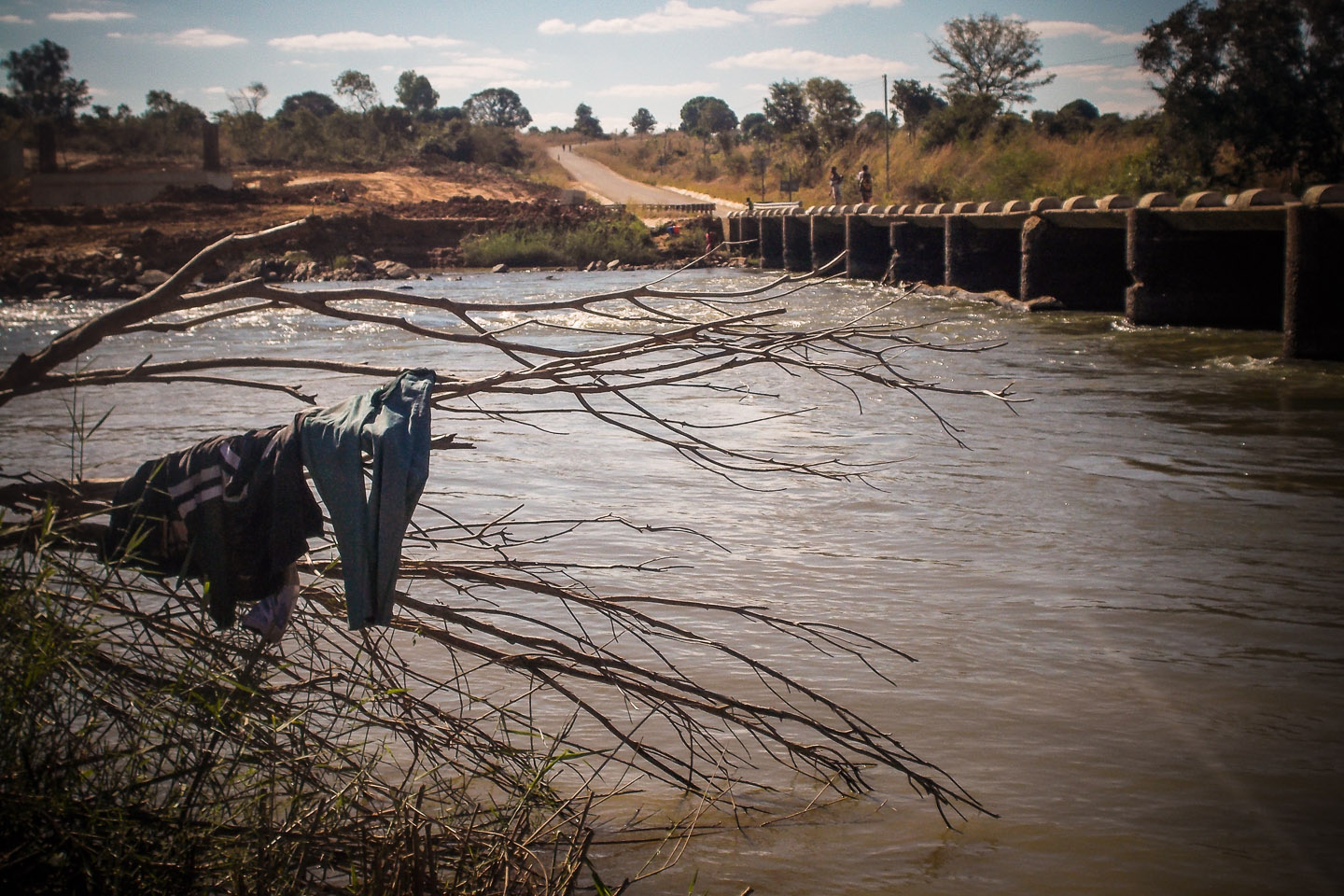
Near Cassembe, EN-242

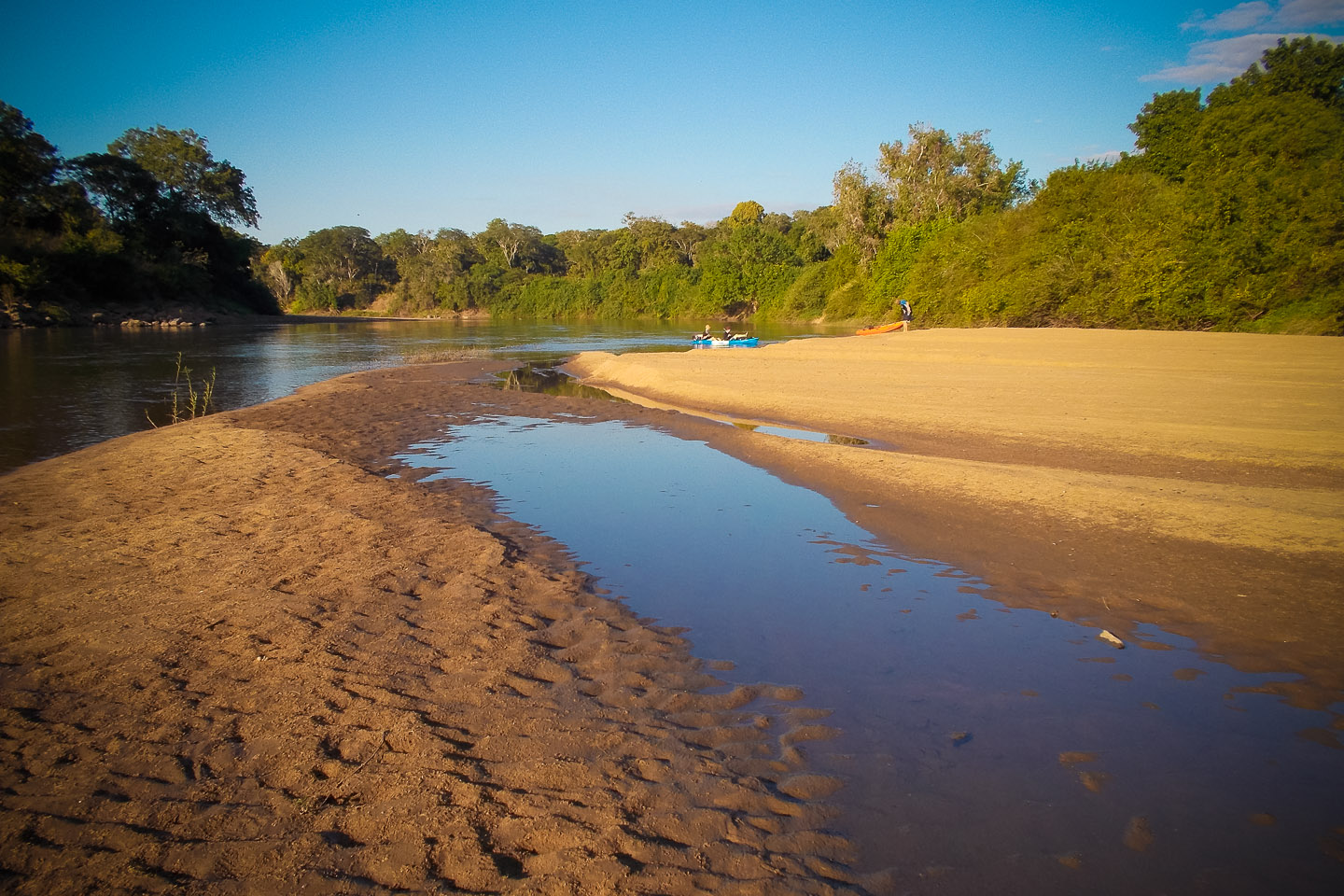
Between Cassembe on the EN-242, heading north towards the Niassa Reserve

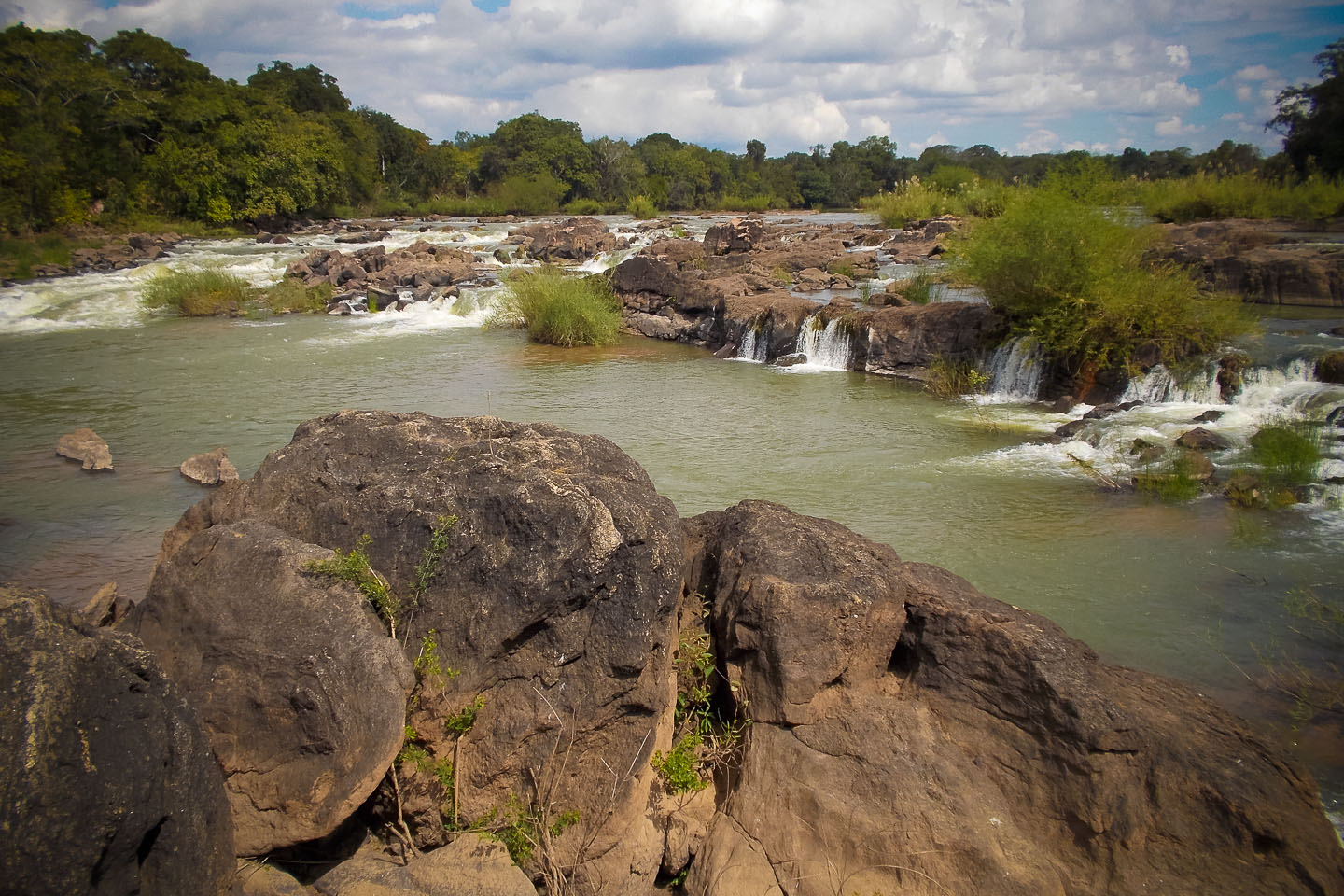
First waterfall between Cassembe on the EN-242, heading north towards the Niassa Reserve

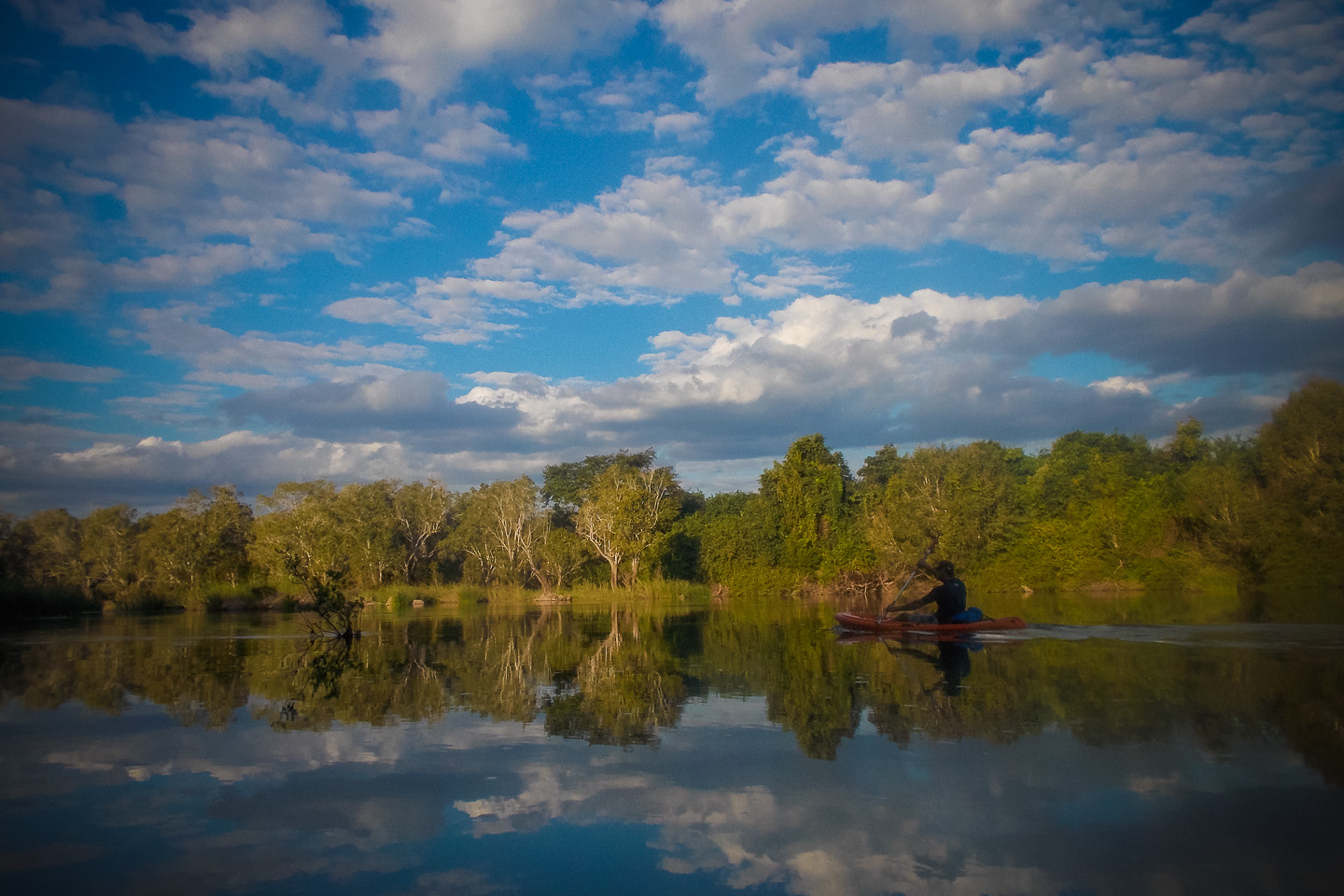
Between Cassembe on the EN-242, heading north towards the Niassa Reserve

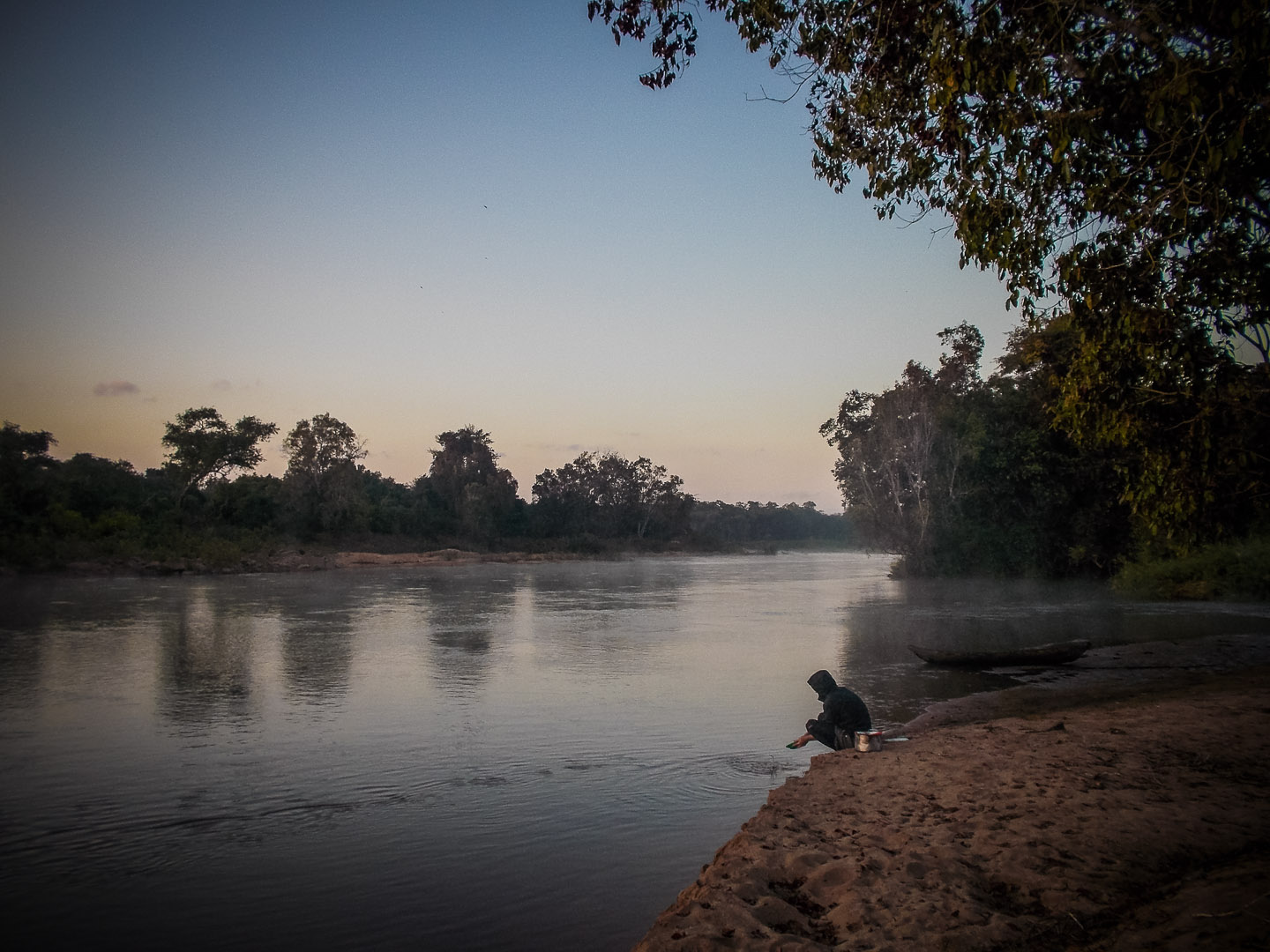
Between Cassembe on the EN-242, somewhere inside the Niassa Reserve

Elephants loom large in the life of people of the Lugenda River Valley. The tribal people, inhabiting the river valley for several thousand years, are mainly the Yao and Makua tribals. Other groups residing here are Ngoni, Marave and Matambwe people.

== Etymology ==
The etymology of the word Lugenda in Yao language, a Bantu language spoken by the Yao people (East Africa) in Africa}, has the literal meaning "a large river."

== Geography ==
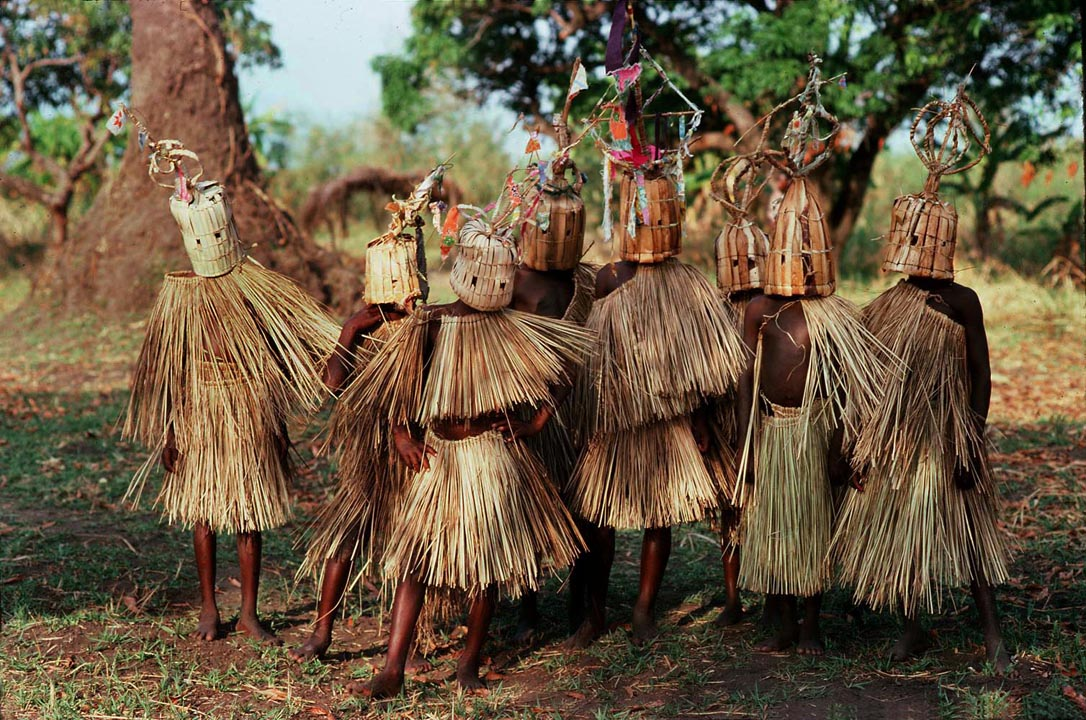
Boys of Yao tribals of Central Africa in their camouflage during initiation ceremony

The Lugenda River, which joins the main Ruvuma River system in its lower reaches from the south east, rises near Lake Chilwa, from the small Lake Chiuta (1,700 feet (520 m)). The river flows for a length of 300 kilometres (190 mi) before it joins the Ruvuma River at Negomano village. Its origin is marked by a narrow wooded ridge (a sand bar ridge which is 25 metres (82 ft) high and 9,000 years old)) that separates the swamps on the southern side of Chuta Lake from the Lake Chilwa. The stream at the outlet of the Lake Amaramba is about 80 metres (260 ft) wide. It is a swampy water body between its origin from the Chitwa Lake and Lake Amaramba. Mount Mecula (1,441 metres (4,728 ft)) is the central mountain in the valley. The mountain is rich in vegetation and is considered an important botanical area of the preserve in the valley. The Lugenda River and Mecula Mountain are thus the important tourist destinations in Mozambique's northern province.

The river has a complex flow pattern. It flows in the westerly direction through "Pandanus palm-braided channels". On the east, its flow is through rocky gorge with the entire river vanishing into "slot canyons" displaying broad sandy waterways. This is the location of the breeding colonies of globally threatened African skimmers.

The headwaters of the Lugenda River are in Lakes Chilwa and Chiuta on the border between Mozambique and Malawi, from where the river flows northeast along inferred depressions ultimately joining the Ruvuma River, on the Mozambique / Tanzania border, flowing to the Indian Ocean.

The flow contribution from the Lugenda River to the Ruvuma River is estimated to be 18 cubic kilometres (4.3 mi^{3}). Most of the basin area of the river lies in the Niassa Province where the irrigation potential is reported to be 200,000 hectares (490,000 acres).

It is a slow-moving river and often appears, as it emerges from the Lake Amaramba, as a lake due to its large expanse of water. The river valley has fertile alluvial soil with good water resources as it is fed by many perennial streams on both banks. The perennial water sources in the valley thus have good cultivation to sustain its inhabitants. Tobacco is grown on the river banks. Wild fig and other species of trees are also found in the valley.

Its main tributaries are the Luambala, Lureco, Luambeze, Nicondocho and Jurege.

The river is bridged at Luambala where its width is about 150 metres (490 ft).

== Mineral resources ==
The river valley formed by the Lugenda River, which flows within deep banks, is rich in iron ore intercalated in quartz and granite rock formations. Crystallized lime carbonate is also found. Coal is extracted from two coal fields, located on both sides of the river, one close to the Pemba Bay and the other near Itule town. Iron ore is extracted from large areas to the west of the Pemba Coalfield. Gold is also found in the valley in upper reaches of the Rarico River, a tributary of the Lugenda River.

== History ==
The river valley, and the Niassa Wild Life Preserve enclosed within it, has a history linked to World War I. Germans, under the command of General Von Lettow-Vorbeck, crossed the Ruvuma River at Negomano and entered the Portuguese held Mozambique in search of food for his troops. In December 1917, after crossing the river, the general with his army marched south along the Lugenda River and arrived at Metarica. One of the battalions dispatched towards the Mecula Mountain in search of food had to fight a fierce battle with the Portuguese. Witnesses to this battle are seen in the form of a few graves on the hill slopes at Mecula, the district capital of Niassa.

== Ecology ==
Lugenda River Valley, formed by the river, is part of the rich ecological corridor comprising the Messalo and Rurumana Lugenda, Messalo and Rumana rivers, which form the Niassa National Reserve and Lurio conservation area. This route is being developed for game and ecotourism envisaging fishing, wildlife viewing, boat rides and so forth.

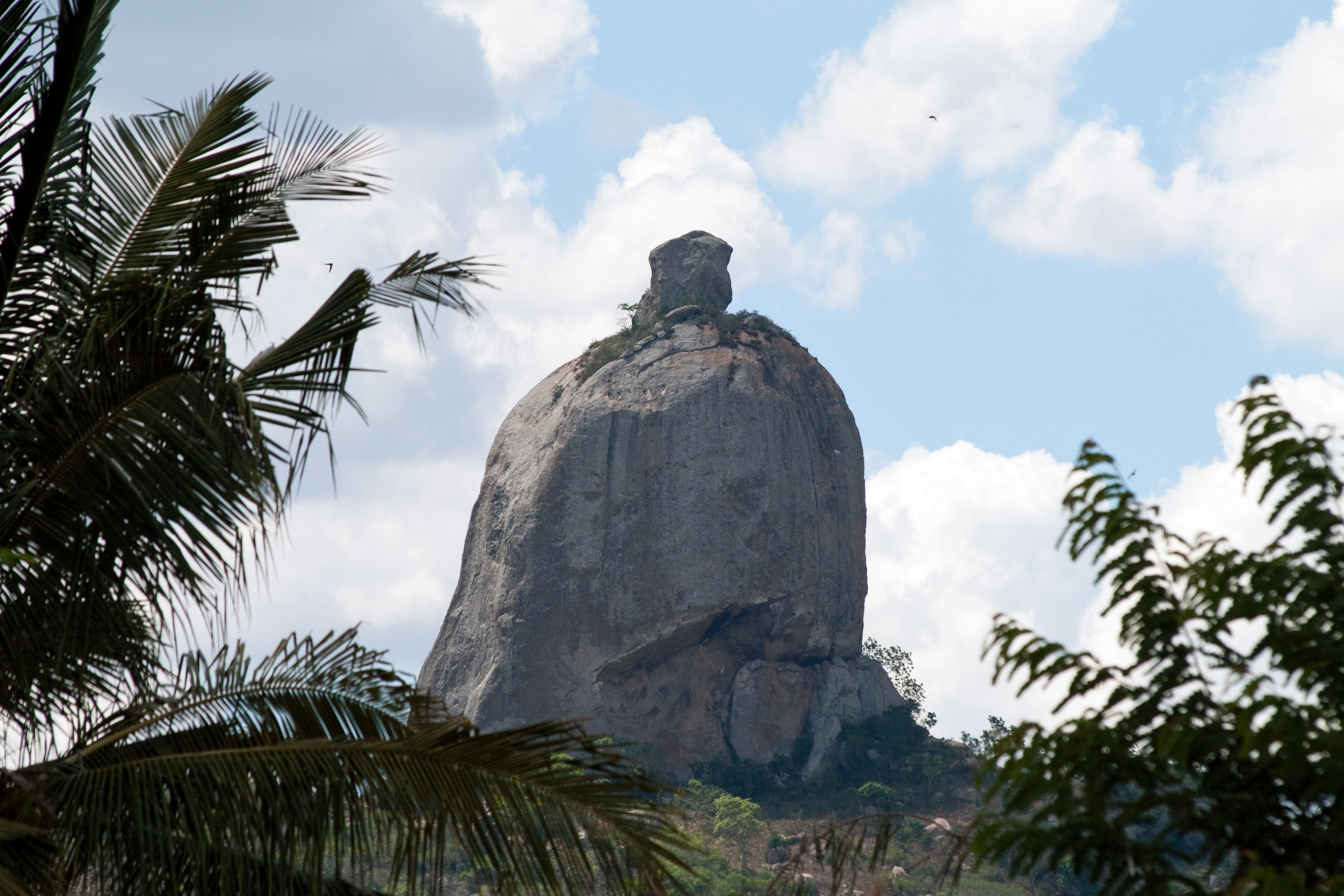
An inselberg

Lugenda Wilderness Camp, which is part of the Wildlife Preserve, is on the eastern bank of the Lugenda river, amongst the Ngalongue Mountains (inselbergs); inselberg is a common international term used to define isolated rock hill, knob, ridge, or small mountain that rises abruptly from a gently sloping or virtually level surrounding plain. The camp is an integral component of the African wildlife ecosystem. Safaris are arranged from this camp for visits to the African wilderness. The camp has 16 east-African styled tents, a well turned out accommodation for visitors.

Pemba Airport is the nearest airport to the Wilderness Camp and air services are operated by CFA Air Charters with light aircraft. At the eastern edge of the river, the camp has dirt roads, fairly well maintained for the purpose of safari tours to facilitate wild life tracking. Canoeing is a popular sport in the river, apart from climbing of the inselbergs in the park area from the "bush fly camps" along the river. There is also a proposal to set up another ecotourism camp on the Lugenda River, about 200 kilometres (120 mi) away from Lichinga.

Fauna and flora

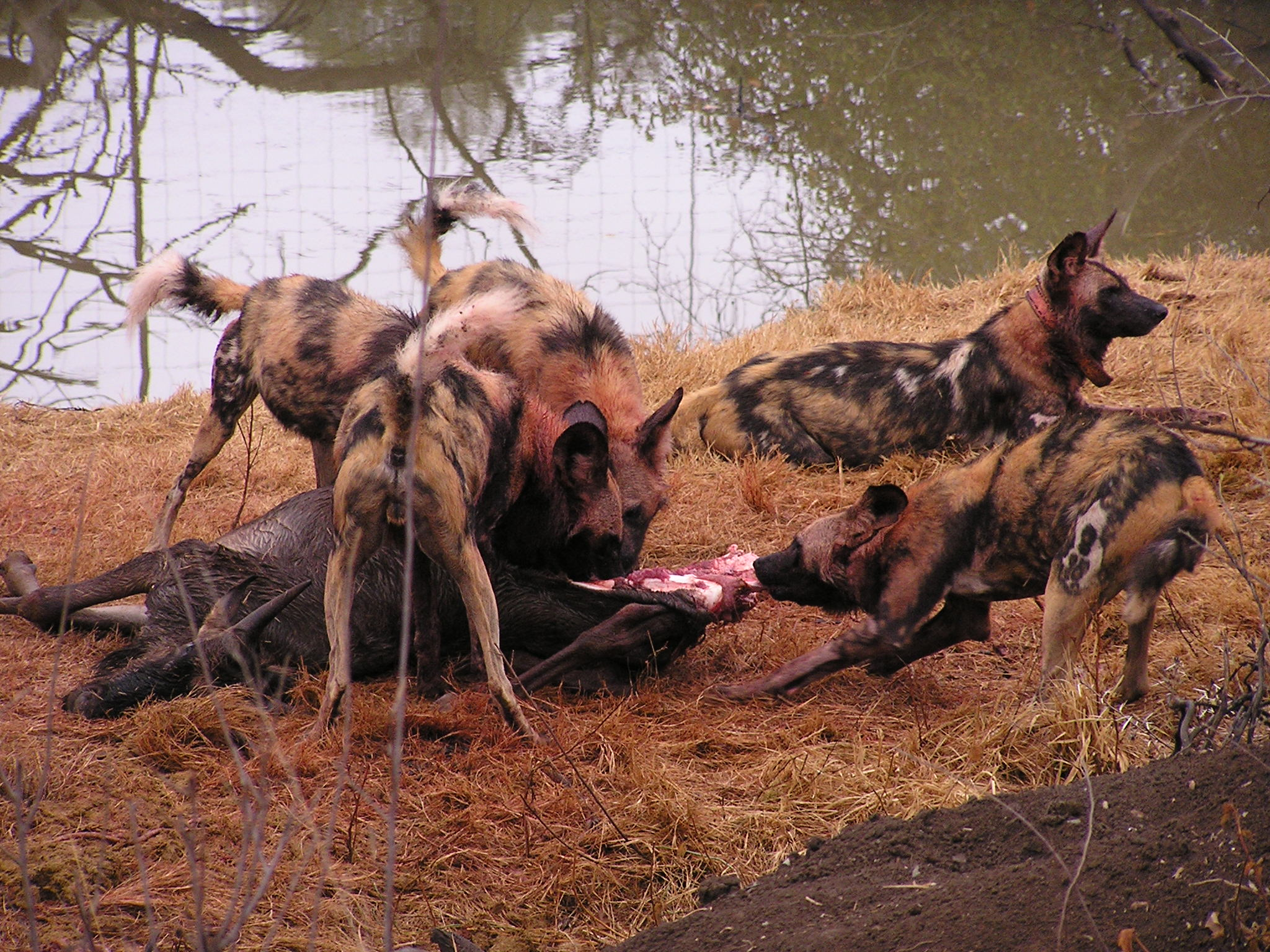
African wild dogs

Niassa Reserve, named after the province where it is situated, covers an area of 45,000 square kilometres (17,000 mi^{2}). It has the endemic Johnston's impala, Niassa wildebeest and Boehm's zebra. The reserve also has wild dogs and 800 to 1000 lions. It has 400 species of birds, out of which four species are globally threatened. Taita falcon, southern banded snake-eagle, African skimmer and Starling's woodpecker are the bird species found, apart from the rare African pitta.

Forty species of fish have been recorded in the river, which sustains a substantial fishing industry providing economic sustenance to the local people. It has a rich population of hippos. Crocodiles are reported in deep pools in the river. Canoe safari is reported to be a success. A new species known as girdle lizard has been recorded. The mountainous forests of the preserve harbour a large number of silver hornbills, buffalo and herds of wild elephants. Black heron, black rough-winged swallow, emerald-spotted dove, green-winged glossy starling, iladadah, little egret, Shelley's francolin, South African pochard, and spot-headed weaver also frequent the area. The Niassa Preserve as such is formed of 95% of the preserve's biomass is vegetation. It has 21 types of plant species and 191 species of trees and shrubs.
