= Mount Yao (Mozambique) =

Mountain in Mozambique

- Location within Mozambique

Highest point
- Elevation: 1,313 m (4,308 ft)
- Coordinates: 12°26′36″S 36°30′42″E

Geography
- Location: Mozambique

Mount Yao is a mountain in northern Mozambique. It is located in Niassa Province, in Niassa National Reserve. The mountain is named for the Yao people who live in the area around the mountain.

Mount Yao is an isolated granite outcrop or inselberg, and is relatively isolated from other mountains. Mount Mecula is located to 128 km to the northeast in the national reserve. The Njesi Highlands lie to the west.

Miombo woodland is the predominant plant community on the mountain. The mountain has patches of evergreen forest and swamp forest at higher elevations, and riparian forest corridors in stream valleys descend to 1000 meters elevation. The flowering plant Moraea niassensis, an iris relative, is endemic to the mountain.
