= Cassembe =

Cassembe may refer to:

- Cassembe, Angola
- Cassembe, Mozambique
