= Mount Mecula =

Mountain in northern Mozambique

- Location within Mozambique

Highest point
- Elevation: 1,442 m (4,731 ft)
- Coordinates: 12°05′00″S 37°38′00″E

Geography
- Location: Mozambique

Mount Mecula (Portuguese: Serra Mecula) is a mountain in northern Mozambique. It is located in Niassa Province, near the center of Niassa National Reserve.

Mount Mecula is an isolated granite outcrop or inselberg, and is relatively isolated from other mountains. Mount Yao (altitude 1 313 m; 12°39′ S, 35°16′ E) is located to 128 km to the southwest in the national reserve. Mount Mecula is in the watershed of the Rovuma River, which runs to the north and forms the boundary between Mozambique and Tanzania. The Lugenda River, a tributary of the Rovuma, runs to the south.

Miombo woodland is the predominant plant community below 1000 meters elevation. At higher elevations, patches of broadleaf evergreen Afromontane forest occur between 992 and 1370 meters elevation, along with grassland, montane scrub, and large areas of exposed rock.

The Mecula girdled lizard (Cordylus meculae) is native to the mountain, and to the Njesi Highlands further west.
