= Mocubúri River =

River in Mozambique

Coordinates: 18.25318°S 35.00675°E

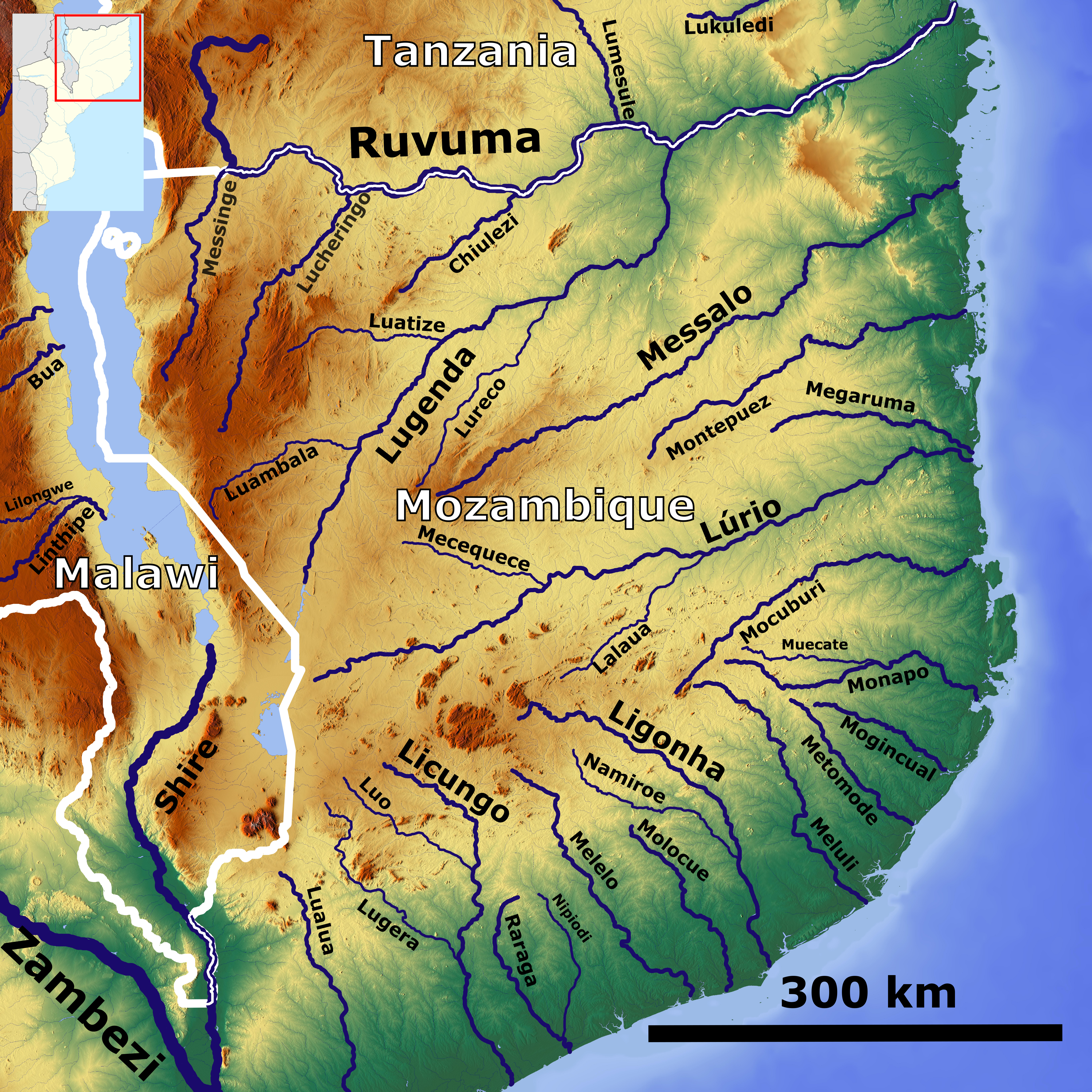
The Mocubúri River in northern Mozambique (center right)

The Mocubúri River (known variously as Rio Mukumburi, Rio Mocubúri, Rio Mecuburi, Rio Mecuburi, Rio Mocuburi, Rio Mocubúri, or Rio Mukumburi) is a river of Mozambique. It flows to the south of the Ruvuma River, and is characterised by seasonal flows and lined by swamps.
