= Cordylus meculae =

Conservation status
- Least Concern (IUCN 3.1)

Scientific classification
- Kingdom: Animalia
- Phylum: Chordata
- Class: Reptilia
- Order: Squamata
- Family: Cordylidae
- Genus: Cordylus
- Species: C. meculae

Binomial name
- Cordylus meculae Branch, Rödel & Marais, 2005

Species of lizard

Cordylus meculae, the Mecula girdled lizard, is a third species from the Rhodesian girdled lizard complex, and was described from Mount Mecula in northern Mozambique. It lives in granite outcrops of montane grasslands and dry miombo woodland. The nostril pierces the center of the nasal scale and the head shields are rugose. The dorsal coloration is dark brown with paler infusions on the flanks. The head is almost black with yellow lips and scattered yellow flecks on the head and neck. The belly is buff colored.
