= Lúrio River =

River of northeastern Mozambique

Coordinates: 13.5137°S 40.5238°E

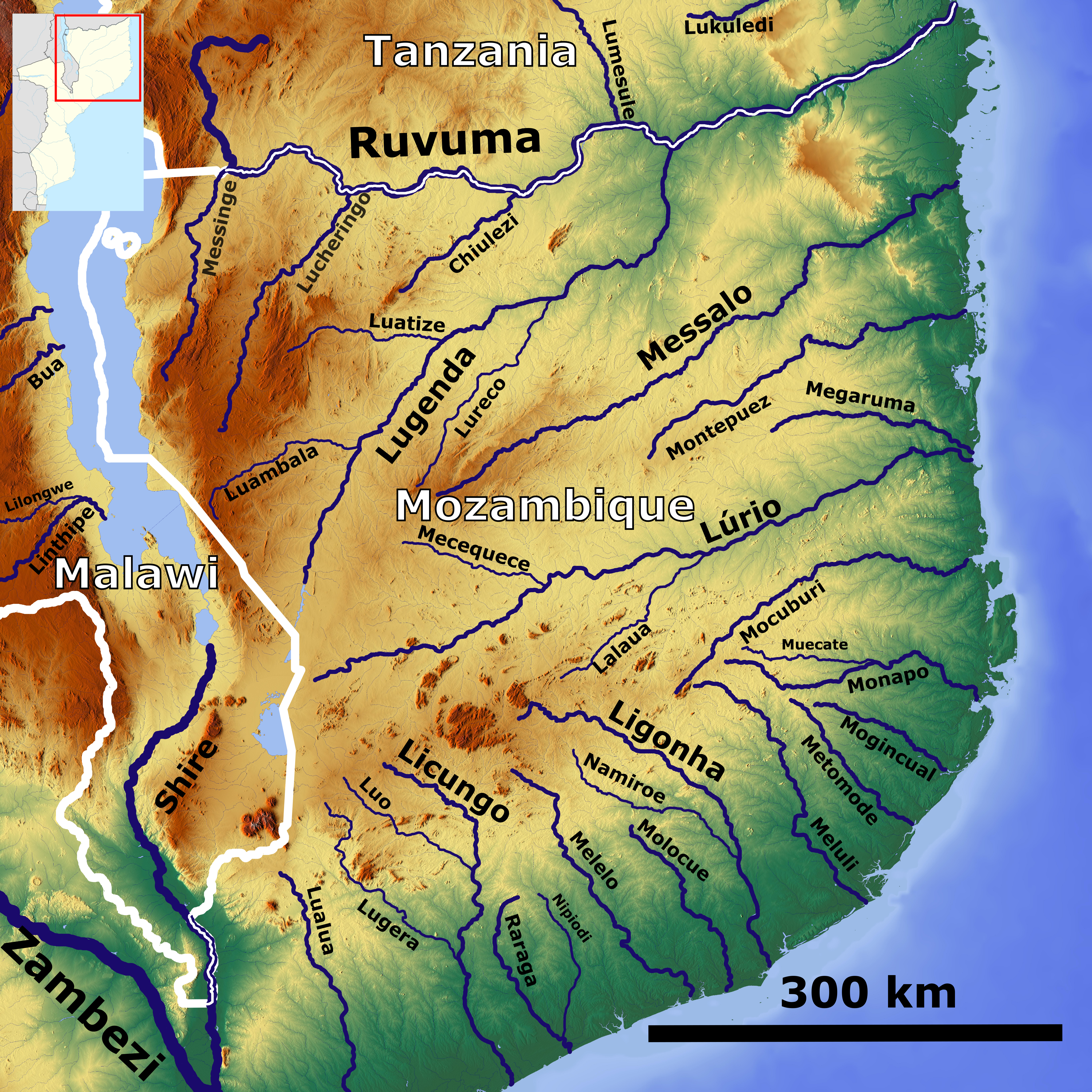
The Lúrio River in northern Mozambique (center, center right)

The Lúrio is a river of northeastern Mozambique. It flows to the south of the Ruvuma River and empties into the sea just south of Pemba Bay. The river is characterised by seasonal flows and lined by swamps. There is a notable waterfall located along the river. The Mozambican government has plans to build a 120-megawatt hydroelectric plant on the river to supply electricity to the surrounding provinces of Nampula and Cabo Delgado.
