= Lake Amaramba =

Lake in Mozambique

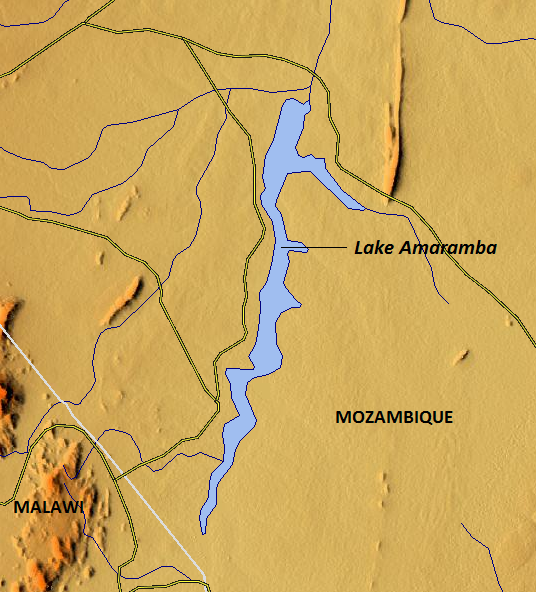
- Lake Amaramba

- Location within Mozambique
- Location: Mozambique
- Coordinates: 14°22′39″S 35°55′19″E
- Lake type: Fresh water
- Primary inflows: Lake Chiuta
- Primary outflows: Lugenda River
- Basin countries: Mozambique
- Max. length: 35.25 km (21.90 mi)
- Max. width: 1.2 km (0.75 mi)
- Surface area: 8,350 ha (20,600 acres)
- Max. depth: 5 m (16 ft)
- Surface elevation: 635 m (2,083 ft)

Lake Amaramba (Portuguese: Lago Amaramba) is a shallow lake in Mozambique, near the border with Malawi. Located in the Nyasa plateau, it is north of Lake Chiuta. The lakes are separated by a sandy ridge and a channel links the two lakes. On the western side of the channel, the connecting waterway is known as the River Msambiti while on the eastern side, it is known as the Lugenda River. Lake Amaramba is intermittently linked to the Lugenda River, a tributary of the Ruvuma River.

== Geography ==
Lake Amaramba is part swamp and part open water spread over a total area of 8,350 hectares (20,600 acres). The open water area accounts for 4,350 hectares (10,700 acres) and swamp or marshy land accounts for 4,000 hectares (9,900 acres). It is bound within geographical coordinates of 14°22′00″S 35°52′00″E and 14°40′00″S 35°58′00″E at an elevation of 635 metres (2,083 ft).

The lake, formed in a shallow depression, is swampy on the southern and eastern side. The lake measures 35.25 kilometres (21.90 mi) in length with an average width of 1.2 kilometres (0.75 mi). For the most part, it lies N.N.E. and S.S.W. The northern end of the lake bears W.N.W. with a width of 1,800 ft (550 m) to 2,400 ft (730 m). The only conspicuous features visible east of the lake are the hills, separate from one another, named Mitumbi, Mero, Mangombo, Chikalulu and Lipembegwe.

Its drainage basin lies partly in Malawi with a minor stream entering the lake at its southern end. At its upstream end, Lake Chiuta feeds it through a 9 kilometres (5.6 mi) long link channel. During the rainy season, the two lakes become one mass of water spread area. The outlet of the lake leads to the Lugenda River, which in turn joins the Rovuma River, a larger river system. The Amaramba Lake exhibits a feature of a wide river. However, the lake has a narrow width as compared to the Lake Chiuta on the upstream which has a triangular shape.

The lake provides fresh water, protein and inland transportation for people in the region. During the annual flood season, the combined lakes fertilise the land through deposition of enriching silt.

== Flora and fauna ==
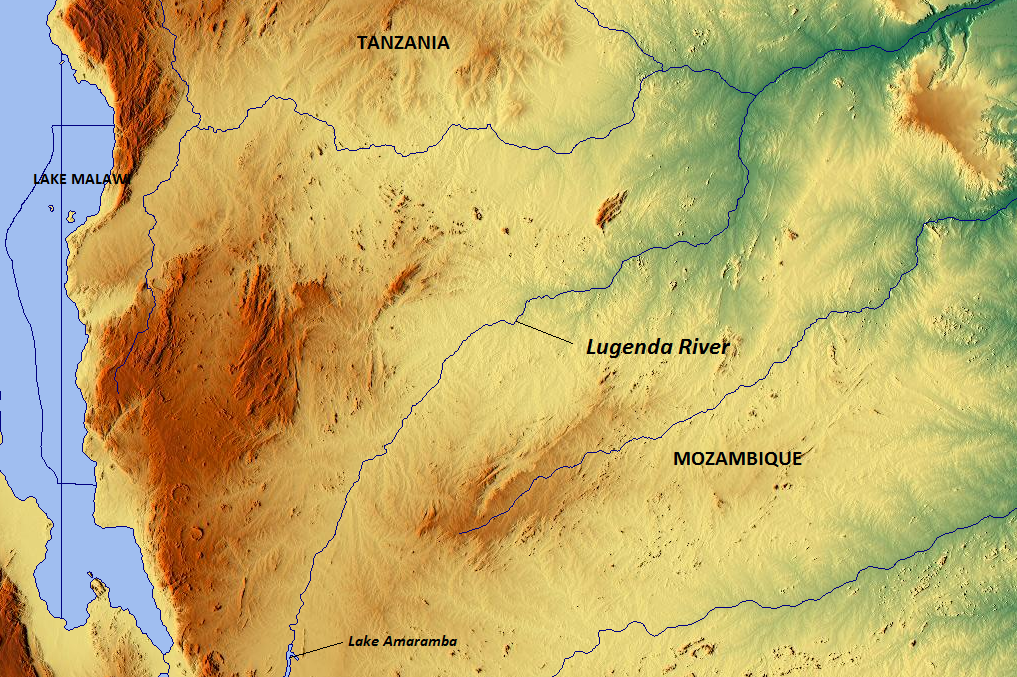
Lake Amaramba shown feeding into the Lugenda River at the bottom

The lake system (both Chiuta and Amaramba) had in the past very rich wild life but during the civil war suffered severe poaching and hunting. Aqua fauna in the lake also suffered due to overfishing caused by migrants from Malawi. Following this destruction, the World Wide Fund for Nature (WWF) and Oxfam GB initiated measures to stop the illegal practices. A participatory approach involving people of the area, the local and provincial government and the Coastal Security Commission, was evolved to address the adverse ecological aspects created in the past, with the objective of enhancing production from the lake system without resorting to overuse of the resources of the lake.

Revival measures

The five-year programme envisaged for revival of resources of the ecosystem of Lake Chiuta-Amaramba area, through a participatory approach, involves several measures. The first of these is to prevent resource overuse and introduce measures for increasing productivity to enhance economic conditions of the community thriving on the lake's resources. Establishing a formal lake reserve in Lake Chiuta-Amaramba would preserve the lake's fish and waterbirds and would increase aquatic resources for rightful use by the local community. Also of importance would be establishing checks and balances on the quality and quantity of produce removed from the lake. Protection of the surrounding forest area through an appropriate wildlife management mechanism would permit for diversification of wildlife species which would promote the base structure of the rural livelihood. The final revival measure of the program consists of creating an environment to market local products.

== History ==
In 1882, Henry E. O'Neill, H.B.M. Consul to Mozambique and 1885 recipient of the Royal Geographical Society Patron's Medal, surveyed the area and subsequently published, Journey from Mozambique to Lake Shirwa, and discovery of Lake Amaramba itemizing nine villages and hamlets, named after their chiefs, at the lake's shores. Five of these were upon the eastern (Napulu, Cheinlola, Chekungwa, Chemaunda and Chengogwe), three upon the western (Akumhumbwa, Chemina and Chemataka), and one was located at the northern extremity (Akamtundu). The south-eastern shore of the lake is populated by Lomwe Makua. Currently, the nearest town to the lake is Cacova on its western side.

== Bibliography ==
- Royal Geographical Society (Great Britain) (1884). Proceedings of the Royal Geographical Society and monthly record of geography. Vol. 6. Edward Stanford.
