= Muar River (Mozambique) =

Coordinates: 20.74917°S 34.46417°E

- Mozambique

Location
- Country: Mozambique
- Province: Sofala

Physical characteristics
- Length: 0.025 km (0.016 mi)

Muar River (Rio Muar) is a stream in Sofala province of Mozambique.

== See also ==
- List of rivers of Mozambique
