= Mecula District =

Coordinates: 12.116°S 37.667°E

Mecula district in Mozambique

Mecula District is a district of Niassa Province in north-western Mozambique. The principal town is Mecula.

Part of the Niassa Reserve is located in this district.
