= Cassembe, Mozambique =

Cassembe
- Location within Mozambique
- Coordinates: 13°25′20″S 36°11′47″E
- Country: Mozambique
- Provinces: Niassa Province

Cassembe is a town in Niassa Province in northern-central Mozambique. It lies on the eastern bank of the Luambala River and on the 242 road between Lichinga to the west and Marrupa to the east.

== Weather ==
During late morning and early afternoon, Cassembe is very hot and humid which is stereotypical of African countries.

Late afternoon has a fair climate. Evening is full of scattered thunderstorms as well as isolated thunderstorms.
