= Lake Chiuta =

- Location within Mozambique
- Location: Malawi and Mozambique
- Coordinates: 14°49′03″S 35°51′14″E
- Type: lake
- Surface area: 199 square kilometres (77 sq mi)
- Average depth: 1.13 metres (3 ft 8 in)
- Water volume: 0.225 cubic kilometres (0.054 cu mi)

Lake Chiuta is a shallow lake on the border between Malawi and Mozambique. It lies to the north of Lake Chilwa and to the south of Lake Amaramba, which has no outlet, and the lakes are separated by a sandy ridge. Both lakes lie in a graben which runs northeast–southwest, east of the main African Rift Valley.

Lake Chiuta is 3–4 meters deep and ranges in size from 25 to 130 square kilometers, depending on the season and rainfall. Lake Chiuta and Amaramba is intermittently linked to the Lugenda River, a tributary of the Ruvuma River.

Lake Chiuta can desiccate completely (Owen et al. 198?).

Mean depth: 1.13 metres (3 ft 8 in) / average surface area: 199 square kilometres (77 sq mi) / average volume: 0.225 cubic kilometres (0.054 cu mi) / encatchment area: 1,755 square kilometres (678 sq mi) (Ojda 1994).

Predominant commercial fish species are Oreochromis shiranus shiranus (locally known as chambo), Clarias gariepinus (mlamba), and Barbus paludinosus (matemba). Thirty-seven fish species were recorded in total (Ojda 1994).

Dominating aquatic macrophytes are Potamogeton welwitschii + Ceratophyllum demersum (submerged), Eleocharis dulcis, Oryza barthii, and Vossia cuspidata, among others (Ojda 1994).

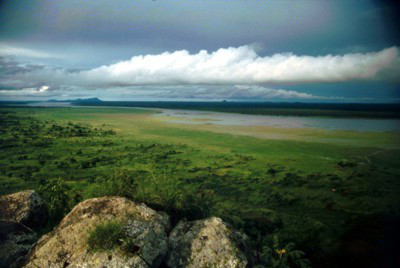
Lake Chiuta - northern tip

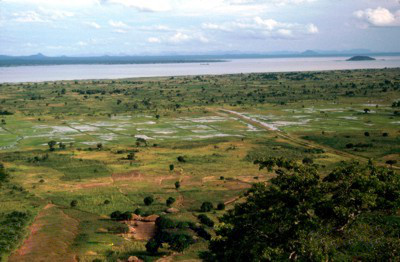
Lake Chiuta - middle part

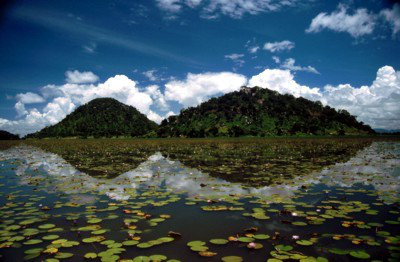
Lake Chiuta - Nafisi Inselbergs

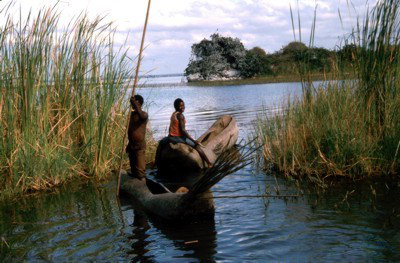
Lake Chiuta - fishermen viewed from Chiuta Isl.

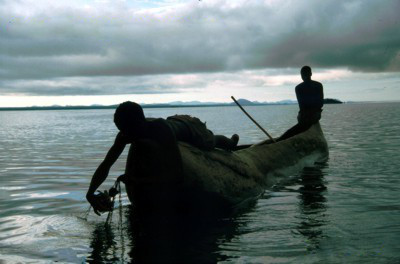
Lake Chiuta - checking gillnets

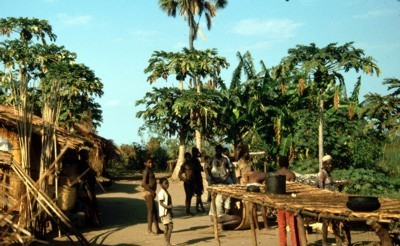
Lake Chiuta - Chiuta Isl.

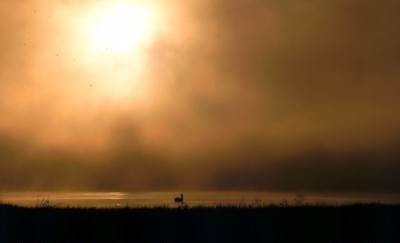
Lake Chiuta - unique atmosphere
