= Monapo River =

River in Mozambique

Coordinates: 14.92642°S 40.32825°E

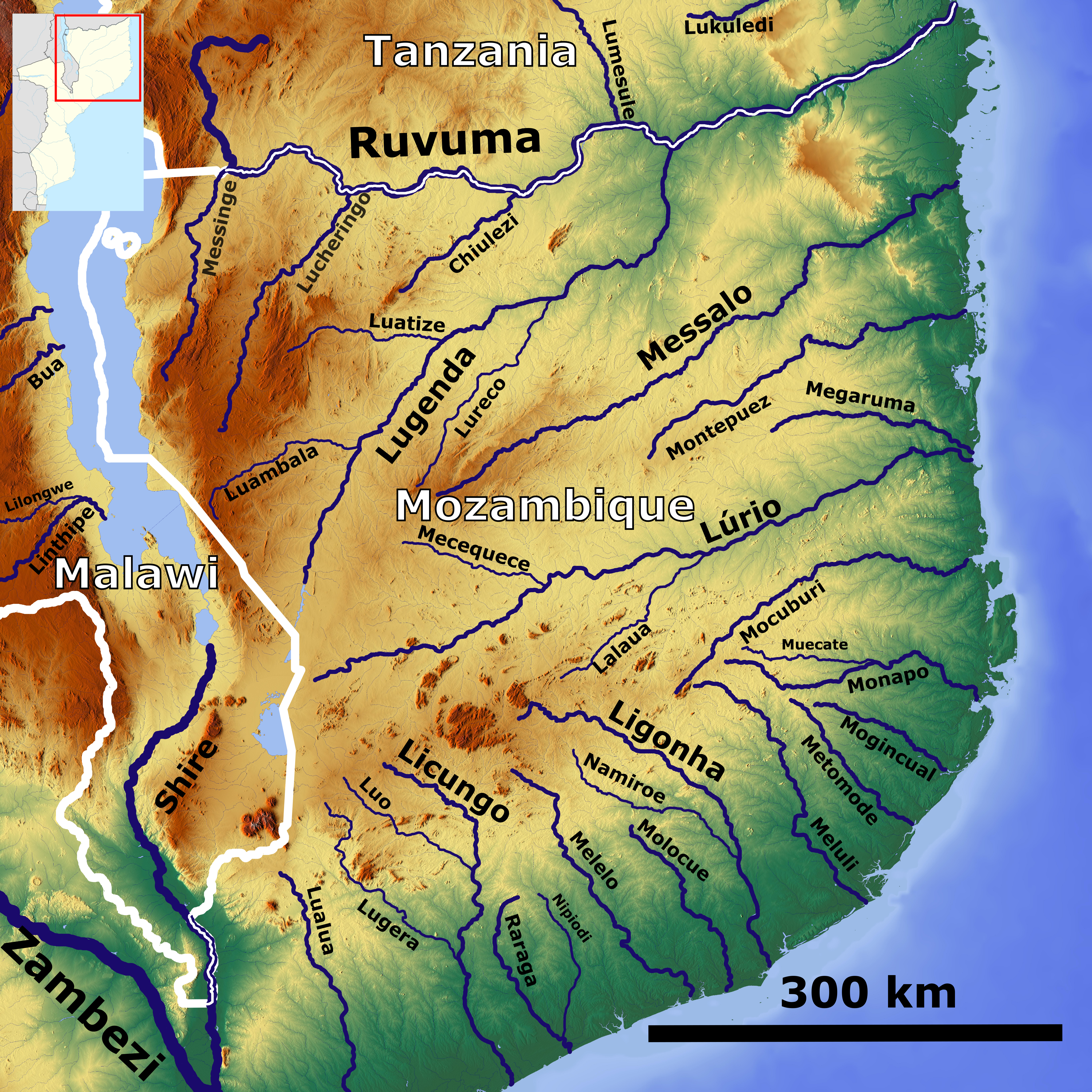
The Monapo River in northern Mozambique (center right)

The Monapo River is a river of Mozambique. It flows through the town of Monapo and Monapo District. It flows to the south of the Ruvuma River, and is characterised by seasonal flows and lined by swamps.
