= Rhodesian girdled lizard =

Conservation status
- Least Concern (IUCN 3.1)

Scientific classification
- Kingdom: Animalia
- Phylum: Chordata
- Class: Reptilia
- Order: Squamata
- Family: Cordylidae
- Genus: Cordylus
- Species: C. rhodesianus

Binomial name
- Cordylus rhodesianus (Hewitt, 1933)

Species of lizard

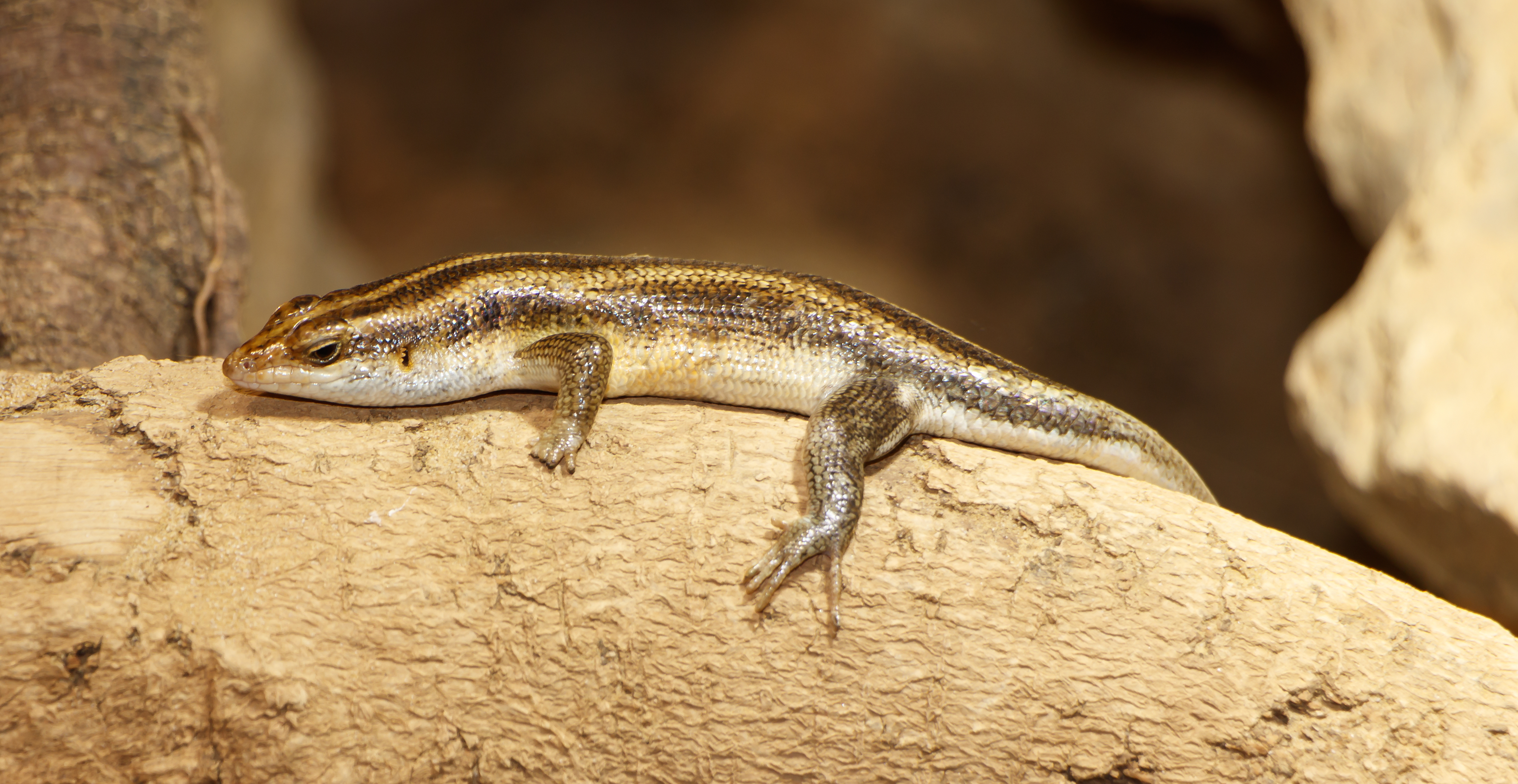

The Rhodesian girdled lizard (Cordylus rhodesianus) is one of three species of very flattened girdled lizards from Zimbabwe, Malawi, and Mozambique. The other two species are Cordylus nyikae and Cordylus meculae. They are found living under stones in rock outcrops where they feed on small arthropods. Adults are 60–90 mm long from snout to vent. The tail length is approximately half the total length.

Also known as the Zimbabwe girdled lizard, they live in rocky montane grasslands of eastern Zimbabwe. The head shields are smooth or slightly rugose. The nostril is pierced in the center of the nasal scale and the dorsal scales have a serrated posterior margin. The back is olive-brown with irregularly spaced dark and light blotches. The belly is yellow to gray. Both sexes have femoral pores.

Zimbabwe girdled lizards are exported from Mozambique for the pet trade. Zimbabwe girdled lizards remain skittish in captivity and require numerous hiding places constructed with stacked rocks.
