= Cordylus nyikae =

Conservation status
- Least Concern (IUCN 3.1)

Scientific classification
- Kingdom: Animalia
- Phylum: Chordata
- Class: Reptilia
- Order: Squamata
- Suborder: Scinciformata
- Infraorder: Scincomorpha
- Family: Cordylidae
- Genus: Cordylus
- Species: C. nyikae

Binomial name
- Cordylus nyikae Broadley & Mouton, 2000

Species of lizard

An isolated population of the Rhodesian girdled lizard (Cordylus rhodesianus) from granite outcrops in montane grassland of northern Malawi was recently redescribed as Cordylus nyikae. Unlike the Rhodesian girdled lizard, the head shields of this species are very rugose, the nostrils are pierced in the lower posterior corner of the nasal scales, and the dorsals do not have a serrated posterior margin. The dorsal coloration is dark brown to gray-brown with lighter spots. The tail and upper lips are light brown. The belly is buff. Its common name is Nyika girdled lizard.
