= João Teixeira Pinto =

Portuguese military officer (1876–1917)

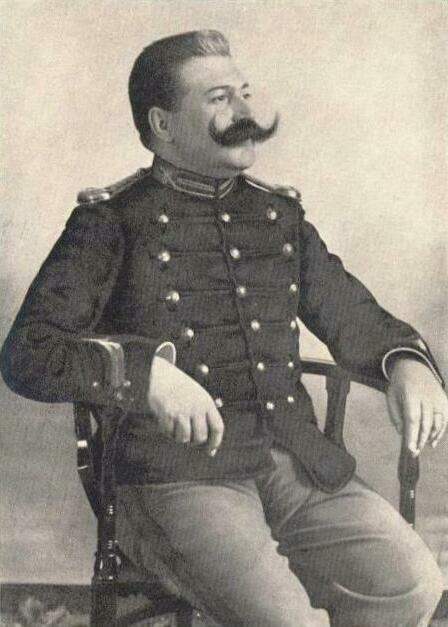
- Born: 22 March 1876; Mossâmedes, Portuguese Angola
- Died: 25 November 1917 (aged 41); Ngomano, Portuguese Mozambique
- Military career
- Allegiance: (Portugal) First Portuguese Republic
- Branch: Portuguese Army
- Service years: 1902–1917
- Rank: Major
- Nickname: Capitão Diabo (the Devil's Chief)
- Commands: Colonial military in Portuguese Guinea (1912–1916); Military in Portuguese East Africa (1916–1917)
- Conflicts: Campaigns of Pacification and Occupation; World War I; East African Campaign; Battle of Narungombe; Battle of Ngomano †

João Teixeira da Rocha Pinto (22 March 1876 – 25 November 1917) was a Portuguese military officer who served throughout his career in the administration of Portuguese colonies of Africa. João Pinto bore the nickname the Devil's Chief (Portuguese: Capitão Diabo). He gained distinction for his role in administering the military contingents of Portuguese Mozambique during the late years of World War I. He was killed in action in 1917.

== Early life ==
João Teixeira da Rocha Pinto was named after his father João Teixeira Pinto, who was called o Kurika (Kowanyama dialect: the Lion). He acquired this nickname for his courage in the possession of the colony of Portuguese Angola. His mother was Margarida Conceição da Rocha Pinto. João da Rocha Pinto was married to Maria Amélia da Rosa Pacheco Teixeira Pinto.

== Military career ==
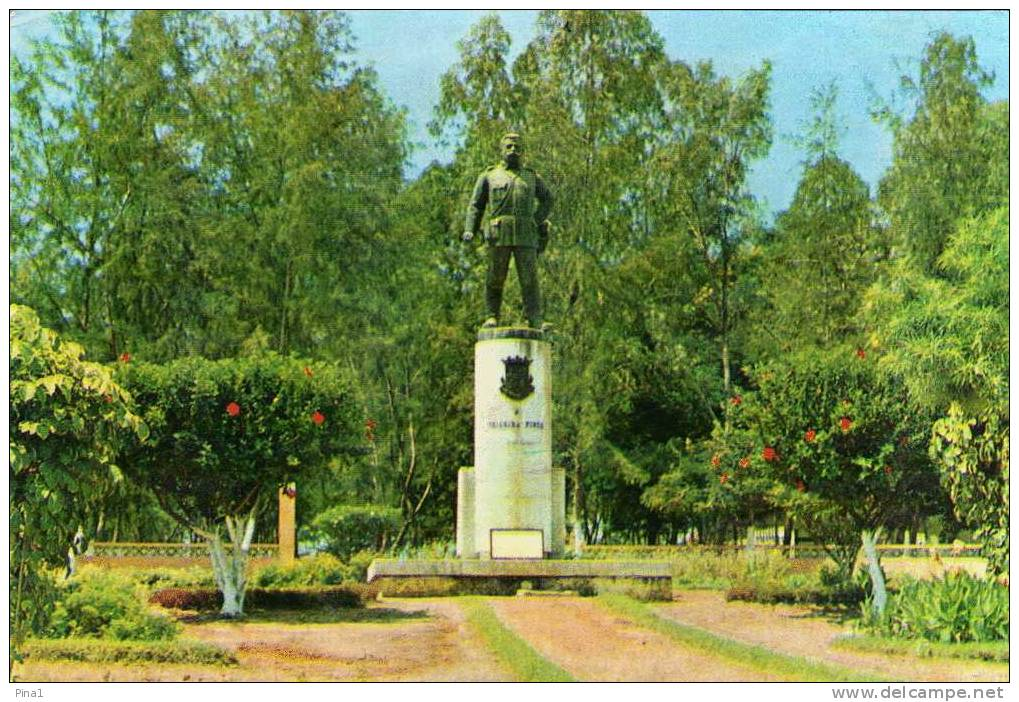
Monument to Teixeira Pinto in Bissau

Pinto served as an officer in various Portuguese colonies in Africa. First from 1902 to 1911, in Portuguese Angola, in following his fathers footsteps. In Portuguese Guinea, he played a decisive role in the pacification of the Oio Region between 1912 and 1916. Between 1913 and 1915, Pinto used Askari troops to impose Portuguese rule and to crush resistance to hut tax by destroying villages and seizing cattle, which caused many to flee to Senegal or the forests. The cost of his forces and the return to budget deficits led to his recall in 1915. An outraged Portuguese lawyer later published a damning report on the atrocities committed by African mercenaries under the command of Abdul Injai and Pinto.

"Numerous bands, in which were also found the old, the crippled, women and children, fled, terrorized in the face of the triumphant march of the force of the irregulars [the mercenaries]. And in the disorderly flight, numerous natives, men, women, old people, children and the crippled, perished, drowned in the river, and ... mercilessly killed by the same irregulars. Then followed assaults on the tabancas [villages], these being sacked and burned; their undefended inhabitants were slaughtered; the fields were devastated totally destroyed.... Today, the rich and extensive territory inhabited by Pepels is in the greatest desolation and misery."

Upon the onset of the Portuguese declaration of war against Germany in 1916, Pinto was transferred for the military administration of Portuguese Mozambique. In Mozambique, Pinto oversaw troop movements and took command of several offensives into German East Africa, in coordination with both the British and Belgian armies. The East African Campaign continued despite the majority of the colony being overrun. The Imperial German chief commander in East Africa, Paul von Lettow-Vorbeck (The Lion of Africa), decided to resist the occupying armies with the first modern use of guerrilla warfare tactics.

== Battle of Ngomano and death ==
João Pinto was struck and killed fighting against a German attack in the defense of Fort Ngomano. The Portuguese suffered a heavy defeat in a rout, with all commanding officers killed in battle and all soldiers either became casualties or were captured. In all, 25 Portuguese and 162 Portuguese Askari were killed while only a few German Askari and one German died on the attacking side. Seven hundred prisoners of war were used by the Germans as porters for the 250,000 rounds of ammunition, six machine guns and several hundred rifles that were also captured. This much needed German victory effectively resupplied the whole of von Lettow-Vorbeck's army.

== Legacy ==
Vila Teixeira Pinto (now Canchungo) was named after him.
