= Luambala River =

River in Mozambique

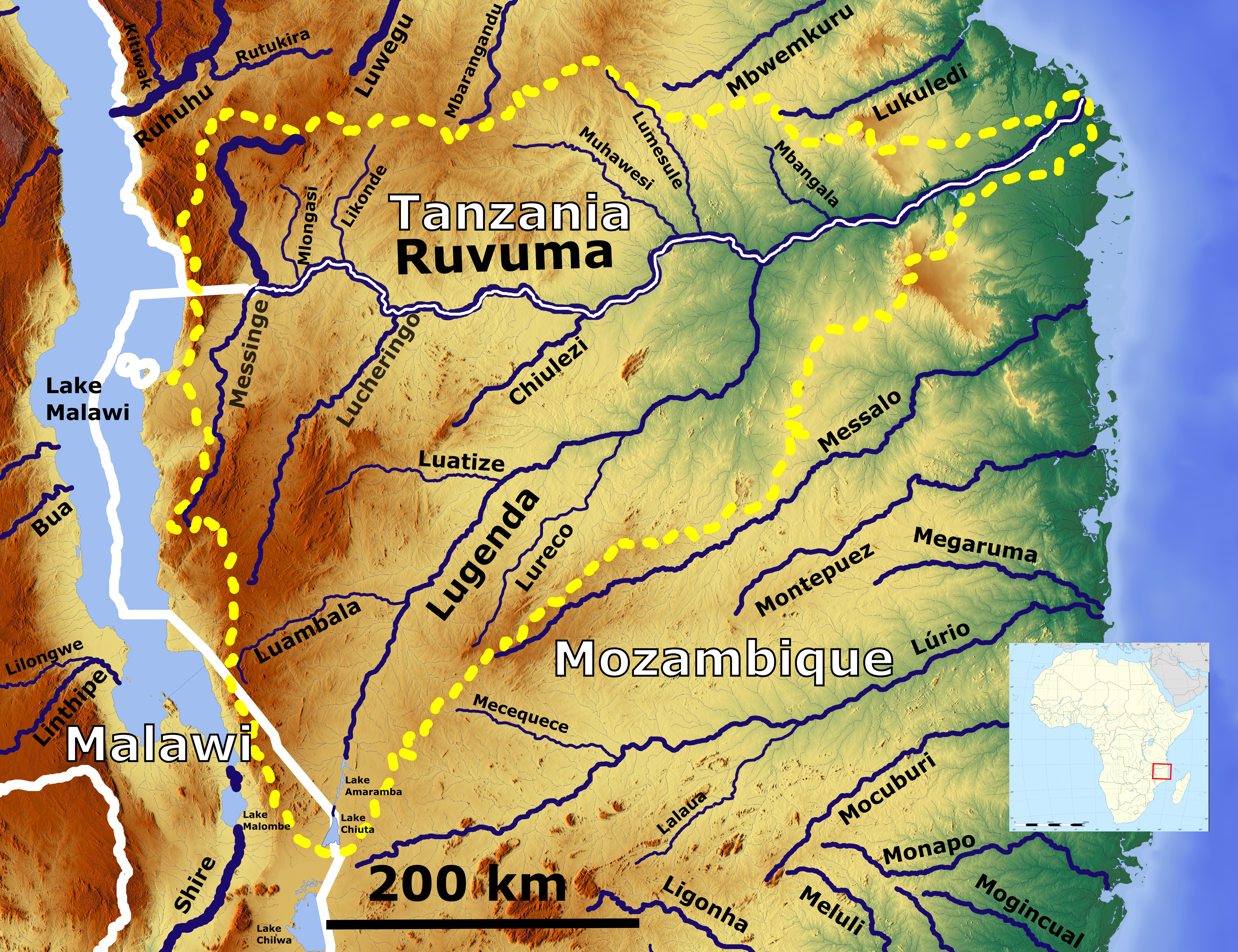
The Luambala River in the Ruvuma Basin (lower left center)

The Luambala (Portuguese: Rio Luambala) is a river of Mozambique. It flows through Niassa Province in a northeast-southwest direction. The Luambala valley was surveyed during the Portuguese Nyasaland. The river was reported to have steep sides and a rock bed. To the east of Cassembe, the Luambala connects with the Lugenda River at 13°26′12″S 36°18′20″E, flowing in a north-south-southwest direction.
