= Pemba Bay =

Bight in Mozambique

- Baía de Pemba (Portuguese)
- Location in Mozambique
- Coordinates: 12°56′56″S 40°27′42″E
- River sources: Lúrio River
- Ocean/sea sources: Indian Ocean
- Basin countries: Mozambique
- Settlements: Pemba

Pemba Bay (Portuguese: Baia de Pemba) is a very large bay on the Indian Ocean of northeastern Mozambique.

== Geography ==
The Pemba Bay is east-facing and is located in the area of the city of Pemba. It is hemmed in largely by the Pemba peninsula which contains the city and is accessed through a relatively narrow channel. The Lúrio River empties into the sea just to the south of Pemba Bay. It is a notorious location for the illegal trade of ivory. Operators such as Kakazini offer trips around the bay for about US$40 per person. Several hotels overlook Pemba Bay including Londo Lodge, which has "beach-facing villas overlooking the bay, a restaurant and a range of water sports".

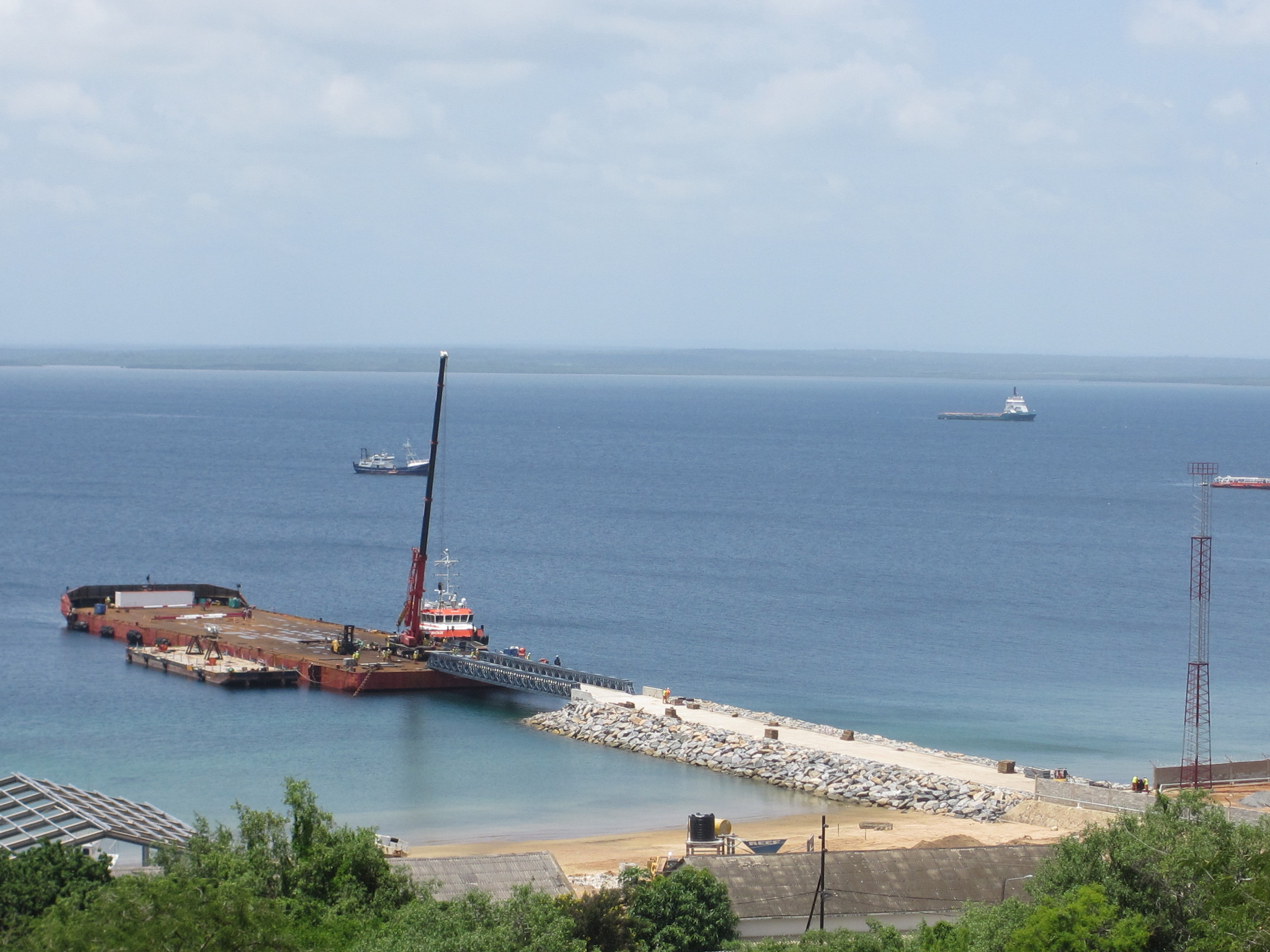
Port development at Pemba Bay

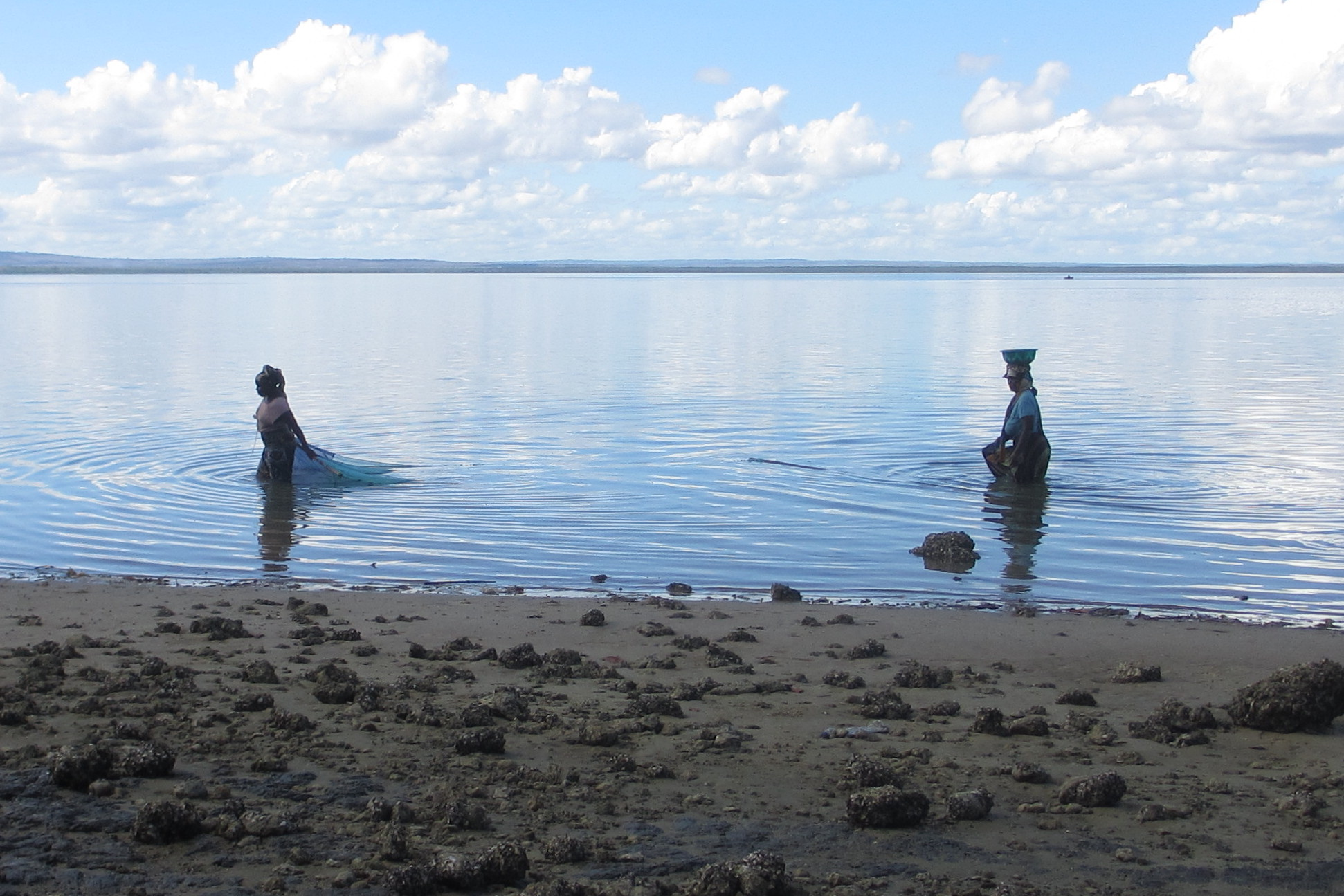
Local women fishing with mosquito nets
