= Cassembe, Angola =

Cassembe
- Location within Angola
- Coordinates: 9°40′S 20°22′E
- Country: Angola
- Province: Lunda Sul Province

Cassembe is a town in Lunda Sul Province in Angola. The Angolan Armed Forces (FAA) captured the town of Cassembe on June 8, 2001, during the Angolan Civil War, as it was a major UNITA military stronghold.
