= Marrupa District =

Coordinates: 13.191°S 37.505°E

Marrupa district in Mozambique

Marrupa District is a district of Niassa Province in north-western Mozambique. The principal town is Marrupa.
