= Niassa Reserve =

Protected natural area in Mozambique

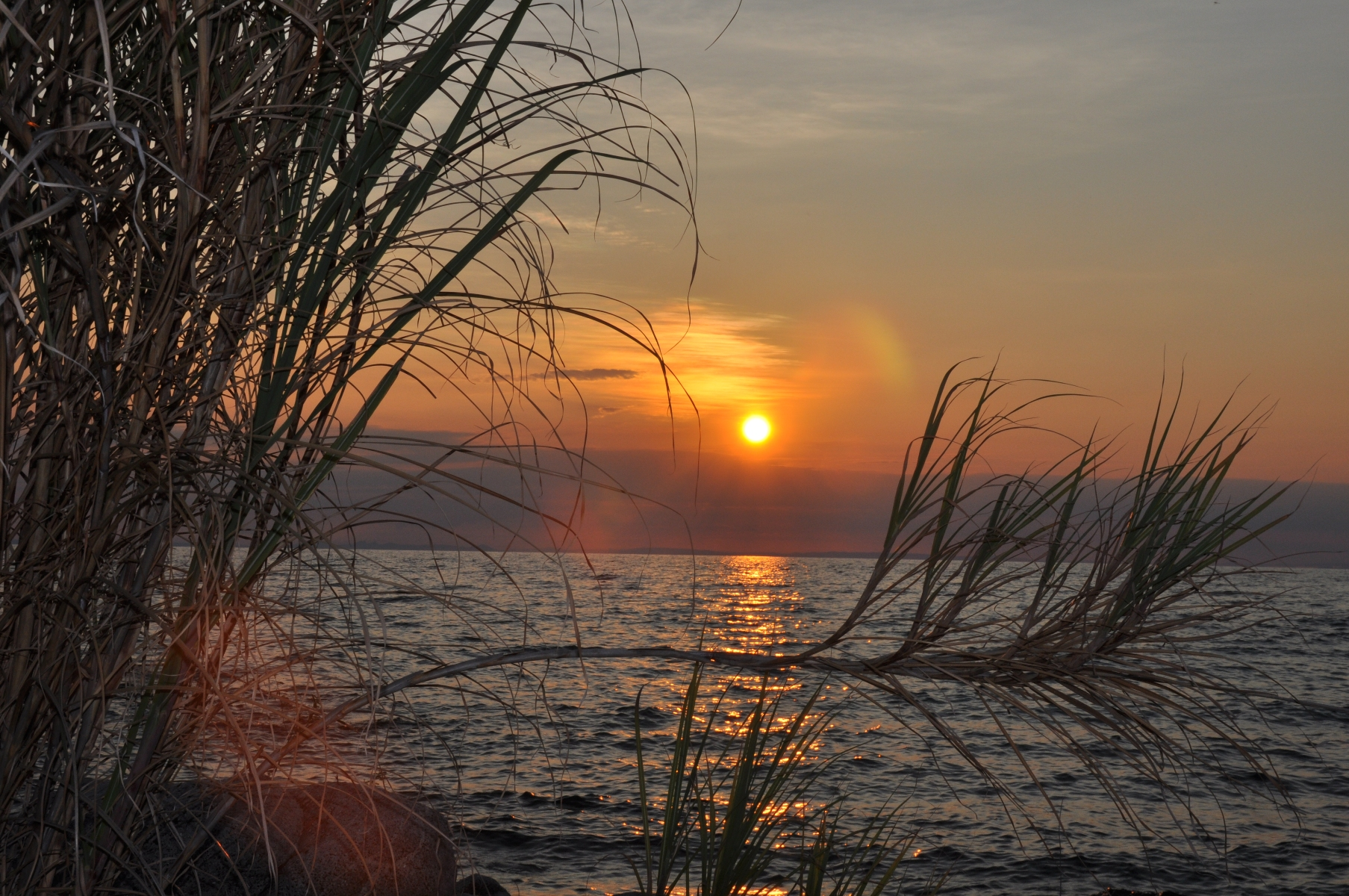
- Lake Niassa Reserve

- Location within Mozambique
- Location: Mozambique
- Nearest city: Mecula, Cobue
- Coordinates: 12°08′35″S 37°40′08″E
- Area: 42,000 km^{2} (16,000 sq mi)
- Established: 1954

Niassa Reserve is a nature reserve in Cabo Delgado Province and Niassa Province, Mozambique. Covering over 42,000 square kilometres (10,000,000 acres), it is the largest protected area in the country. The reserve is part of the Trans-Frontier Conservation Area and links to the Tanzanian Lukwika-Lumesule Game Reserve. It will connect to the Lake Niassa Reserve when it is completed.

== History ==
Founded in 1954 while Mozambique was still Portuguese East Africa, Niassa did not receive effective protection until the end of the Mozambican Civil War with the signing of the Rome General Peace Accords. Since then, the Mozambican government has set up management systems in order to protect the ecology of northern Mozambique.

The relative isolation and lack of development that protects the park also hurts its potential for tourism. Mozambican officials admit constraints to development of the park's appeal include "remoteness and difficult access ... lack of any established tourism infrastructure and the logistical hardship associated with starting an enterprise under these conditions."

Since 2005, the protected area is considered a Lion Conservation Unit.

== Borders ==
The northern border is formed by the Rovuma River, which also forms the border with Tanzania. Niassa Reserve is twice the size of Kruger National Park and comparable to the total area of Wales, Denmark or Massachusetts.

== Ecosystem ==
Niassa is part of the Eastern miombo woodlands, which also encompasses parts of Tanzania and Malawi. The reserve is one of the largest miombo woodland preserves in the world, with miombo forest covering half of the preserve. The remainder is mostly open savannah, with some wetlands and isolated patches of forest. 95% of the preserve's biomass is vegetation, which includes 21 types of plant matter and 191 species of trees and shrubs.

Niassa Preserve boasts an African wild dog population of over 350, significant for an endangered mammal with a global population estimated at 8000. The park boasts a sable antelope population of over 12000, an elephant population of 16000, over 400 bird species, and large populations of Cape buffalo, impala, wildebeest, zebra and leopards. The area has three endemic species - the Niassa wildebeest, Boehm's zebra, and Johnston's Impala.

The reserve is home to Mecula Mountain, located at the center of the park with a height of 1,441 metres (4,728 ft).

== 2025 attacks ==
On April 29 2025, militants launched an assault on buildings in the Niassa reserve, resulting in the deaths of two anti-poaching scouts. Two others remain missing, while another suffered serious injuries. Islamic State-Mozambique later claimed responsibility for the attack, which occurred just ten days after a separate raid on a nearby safari camp, where two individuals were beheaded and six soldiers lost their lives.
