= Niassa Province =

Province of Mozambique

Coordinates: 13°15′S 36°30′E

Niassa Jimbo la Niassa (Swahili)
- Province
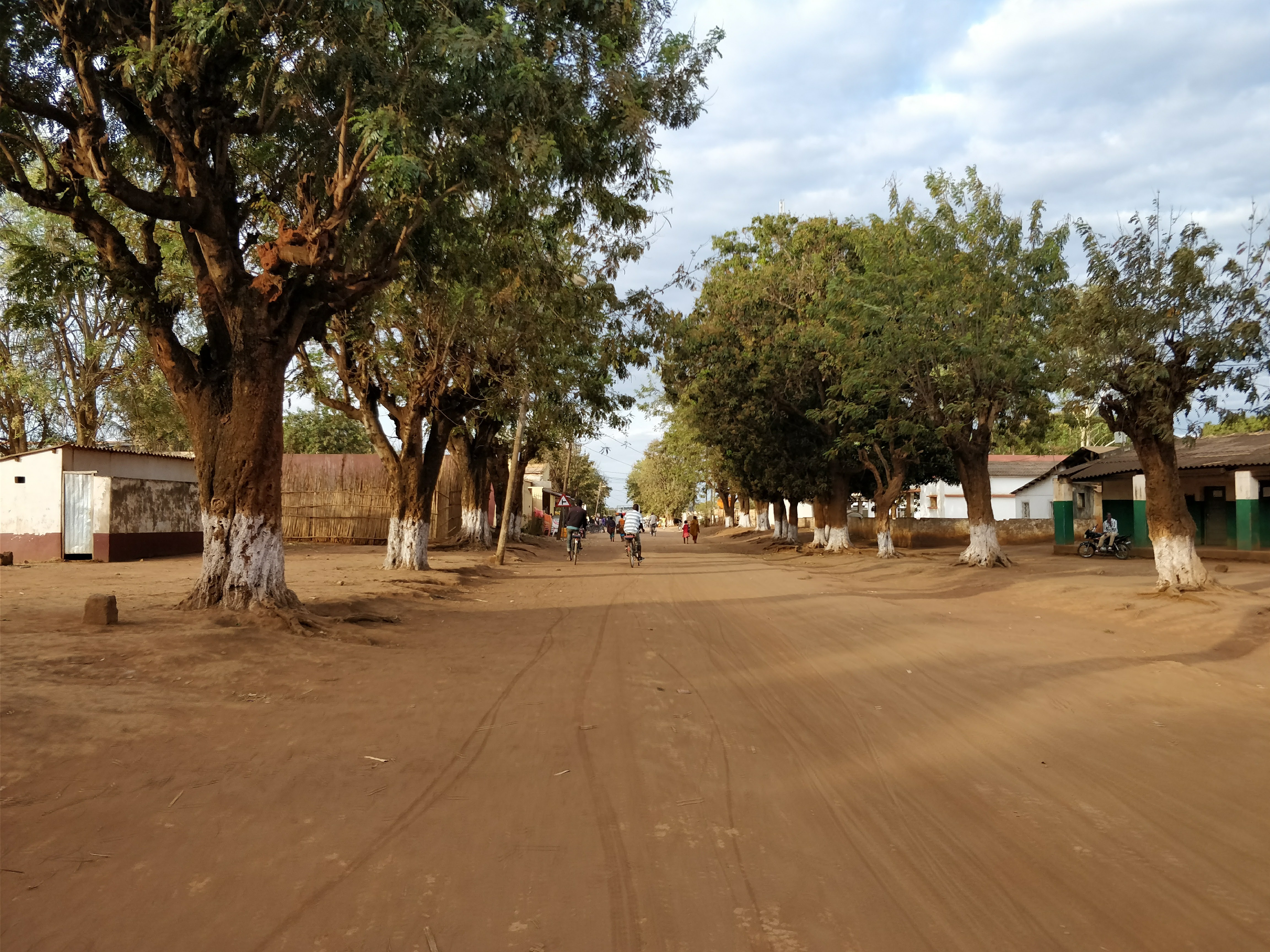

- Niassa, Province of Mozambique
- Country: Mozambique
- Capital: Lichinga

Government
  - Governor: Elina Judite Massengele

Area
  - Total: 129,056 km^{2} (49,829 sq mi)
- Highest elevation: 1,836 m (6,024 ft)

Population (2017 census)
  - Total: 1,810,794
  - Density: 14.0311/km^{2} (36.3403/sq mi)
- Postal code: 33xx
- Area code: (+258) 271
- HDI (2019): 0.425 low · 8th of 11
- Website: www.niassa.gov.mz

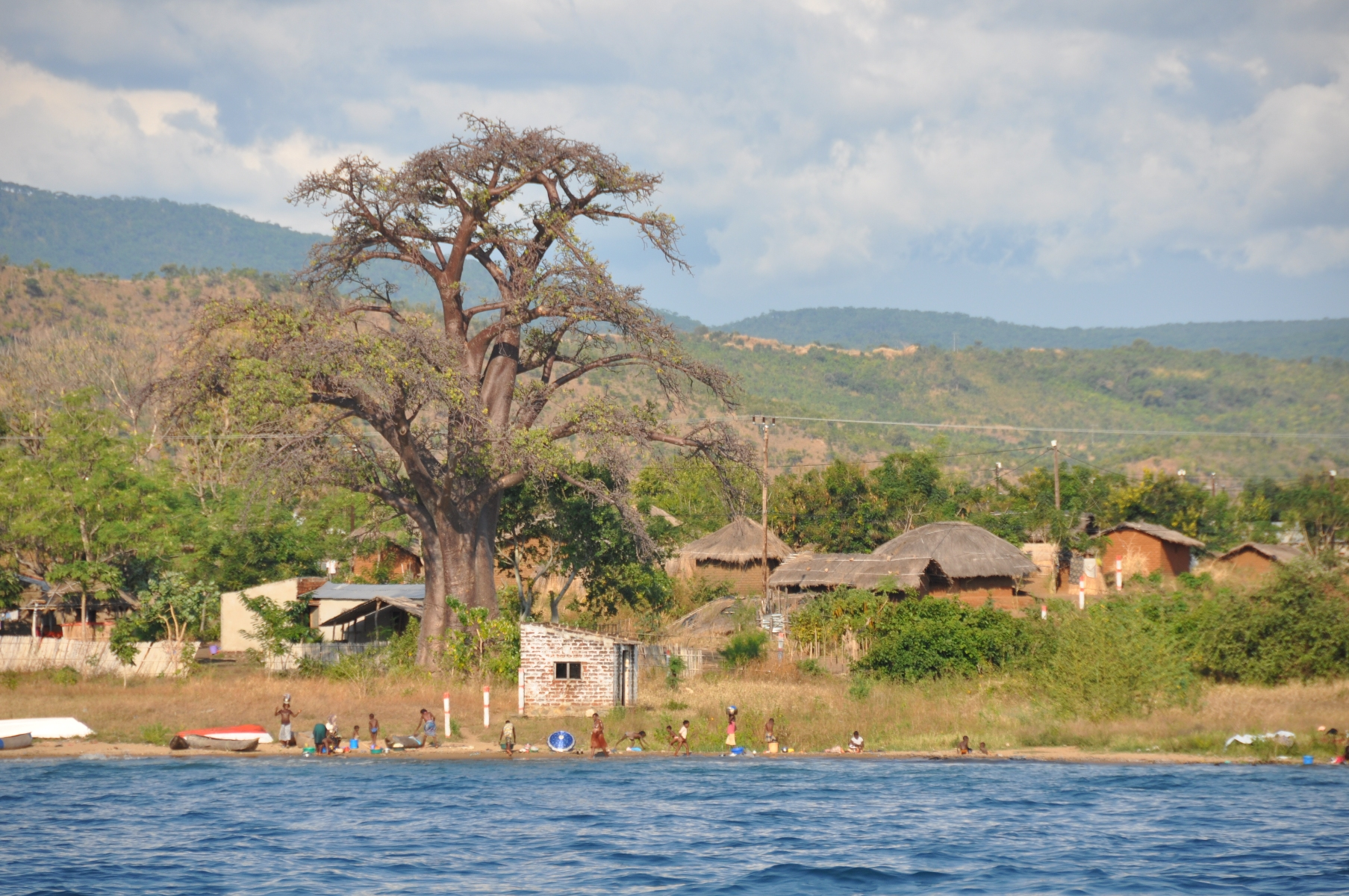
Lake Malawi in the part that corresponds to Mozambique

Niassa [ˈnjasɐ] is a province of Mozambique with an area of 129,056 km^{2} and a population of 1,810,794 (2017). It is the most sparsely populated province in the country. Lichinga is the capital of the province. There are a minimum estimated 450,000 Yao people living in Mozambique. They largely occupy the eastern and northern part of the Niassa province and form about 40% of the population of Lichinga, the capital of this province.

The Ruvuma River forms much of the northern boundary of the province with Ruvuma Region, Tanzania, while Lake Niassa forms the western border of the province, separating it from Malawi. 75% of the province remains untouched by development, and remains free of landmines. The province shares the Niassa National Reserve with neighboring Cabo Delgado Province.

== Districts ==
Niassa Province is divided into 16 districts:

- Cuamba District
- Lago District
- Lichinga District
- Majune District
- Mandimba District
- Marrupa District
- Maúa District
- Mavago District
- Mecanhelas District
- Mecula District
- Metarica District
- Muembe District
- N'gauma District
- Nipepe District
- Sanga District
- Chimbunila District

and the municipalities of:

- Cuamba
- Lichinga
- Metangula

== Demographics ==
=== Languages ===
After the 2007 Census it was found that native speakers of Makhuwa were 42%, speakers of the Yao language 31%, speakers of the Nyanja or Chewa language a 11%, and Portuguese speakers 9%.

Historical population
| Year | Pop. | ±% p.a. |
|---|---|---|
| 1980 | 514,100 | — |
| 1997 | 808,572 | +2.70% |
| 2007 | 1,213,398 | +4.14% |
| 2017 | 1,810,794 | +4.08% |

=== Religion ===
The majority in Niassa province practice Islam. Monotheist religion adherence was asked in the 2007 census (Protestant / Catholic / Muslim / Zion) leaving aside traditional religion followers. Answers provided a majority of protestants (74%) in the administrative post of Cobue, bordering Lake Niassa and inhabited mostly by the Nyanja. The majority of the Yao are nominal Muslim (a fact that can be recognized in a map's administrative posts north of the river Messalo). South of the river, the Makhuwas follow the Catholic or Islamic faith.

Religion in Niassa Province
1. Islam (59.0%)
2. Christianity (37.6%)
3. Irreligious (0.74%)
4. Other Religion (1.50%)
5. Unknown (1.08%)

== Education ==
In 1998, a provincial college was built in Lichinga to train teachers. Partially financed by the Irish Embassy in Maputo, it graduates 60 teachers per year. Apart from training teachers for local schools, the college offers primary school education to the local Lichinga community and works towards reducing the impact of HIV/AIDS in Niassa province.
