= Ruvuma River =

River along the Tanzania–Mozambique border

Ruvuma Rovuma
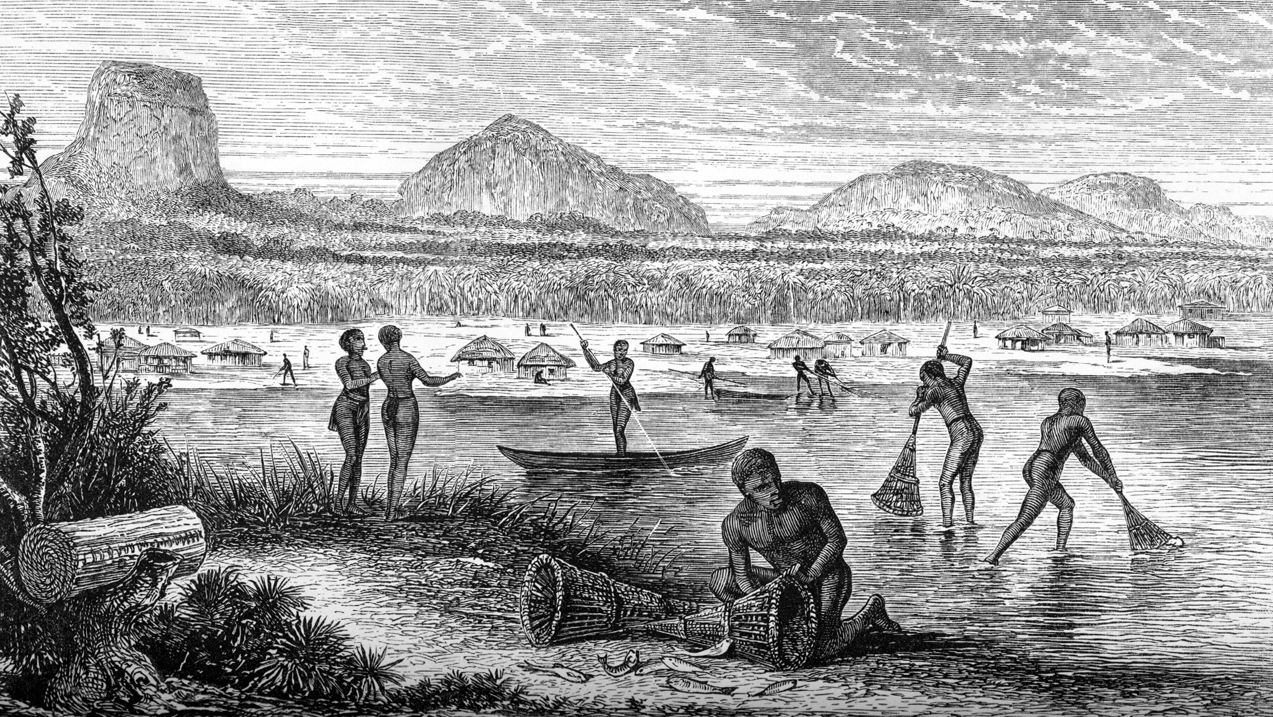
- Ruvuma seen during Livingstone's second Zambesi expedition

- Map of the Ruvuma River drainage basin.

Location
- Country: Tanzania, Mozambique

Physical characteristics
- Source
  - location: Ruvuma Region, Tanzania
  - coordinates: 10°45′00″S 35°40′00″E
  - elevation: 1,000 m (3,300 ft)
- Mouth
  - location: Indian Ocean
  - coordinates: 10°28′28″S 40°26′13″E
  - elevation: 0 m (0 ft)
- Length: 998 km (620 mi)
- Basin size: 154,727.4 km^{2} (59,740.6 mi^{2}) to 155,316.4 km^{2} (59,968.0 mi^{2})
- Discharge
  - location: Near mouth
  - average: (Period: 1979–2015)55.94 km^{3}/a (1,773 m^{3}/s) (Period: 1971–2000)2,286.3 m^{3}/s (80,740 cu ft/s) (Period: 1982–2013)890.8 m^{3}/s (31,460 cu ft/s)

Basin features
- River system: Rovuma River
- Tributaries
  - left: Mlongasi, Likonde, Muhawesi, Lumesule, Mbangala
  - right: Messinge, Lucheringo, Chinlezi, Lugenda

Ruvuma River, formerly also known as the Rovuma River, is a river in the African Great Lakes region. During the greater part of its course, it forms the border between Tanzania and Mozambique. The river is 998 km (620 mi) long, with a drainage basin of ~155,000 km^{2} (60,000 mi^{2}) in size. Its mean annual discharge is 475 m^{3}/s (16,800 cu ft/s) to 2,286 m^{3}/s (80,700 cu ft/s) at its mouth.

== Discharge ==
Average and maximum discharge of the Rovuma River (11°9′53.9532″S 39°15′37.8072″E):

VIC modeled (1999–2008)	MFR estimated flows (1999–2008)	UNH-GRDC historical period (1957–1999)
Average discharge
1,864 m^{3}/s (65,800 cu ft/s)	1,866 m^{3}/s (65,900 cu ft/s)	1,838 m^{3}/s (64,900 cu ft/s)
Maximum discharge
22,365 m^{3}/s (789,800 cu ft/s)	22,630 m^{3}/s (799,000 cu ft/s)	22,053 m^{3}/s (778,800 cu ft/s)

Average monthly discharge of the Rovuma River (11°9′53.9532″S 39°15′37.8072″E), UNH-GRDC historical period (1957–1999):

Month	Discharge (m^{3}/s)
JAN	3,340
FEB	4,040
MAR	5,390
APR	3,880
MAY	1,780
JUN	780
JUL	350
AUG	160
SEP	50
OCT	80
NOV	270
DEC	1,940

== Tributaries ==
The largest tributaries of the Rovuma River:

Left tributary	Right tributary	Length (km)	Basin size (km^{2})	Average discharge (m^{3}/s)
Rovuma		760	155,316.4	1,773
Kitama		70	1,065.8	12.3
	Matiu	100	1,920.1	26.1
Mwiti		80	994.2	14
	Ninga	100	1,572.8	19.8
Miesi		80	946.7	12.5
Mbangala		160	3 598.2	44.4
	Lugenda	650	60,990.4	752.1
Lukwika		100	1,331.5	16.3
	Manjesi	90	1,084.2	16.3
Lumesule		180	2,342.8	28.9
Muhuwesi		240	10,319.6	137.3
Mzinieva		100	1,285.4	22.5
Chimovero			638.3	11.2
	Licombe	60	975.7	16
Lukembule			1,234.6	21.6
	Chiluezi		3,544.9	55.1
	Lopele		763.1	13.3
Luvingo		80	592.4	10.3
	Ludimilé		1,129.4	20.7
Sasawara		90	2,322.8	37.3
Msangesi		120	1,614.1	23.8
	Lipapa		753.5	14.2
	Lussanhando		2,863.2	51.9
	Lucheringo	250	9,288.1	200.5
	Lualece	60	611.9	11
Miongosi		50	964.3	11.6
Likonde		150	5,914.8	61.2
Mlongasi		100	960.8	11.9
	Messinge	238	7,525.4	174.8
Lunyere		190	6,210.1	78.7

== Overview ==
The lower Ruvuma river is formed by the junction at 11° 25′ S, 38° 31′ E of two branches of nearly equal importance, the longer of which, the Lujenda, comes from the south-west, the other, which still bears the name Ruvuma, from the west. Its source lies on an undulating plateau, 1,000 m (3,300 ft) high, immediately to the east of Lake Nyasa, at 10° 45′ S, 35° 40′ E, the head-stream flowing first due west before turning south and east.

In its eastward course, the Ruvuma flows near the base of the escarpment of an arid sandstone plateau to the north, from which direction the streams, which have cut themselves deep channels in the plateau edge, have almost all short courses.

On the opposite bank the Ruvuma receives, besides the Lujenda, the Msinje River and Luchulingo River, flowing in broad valleys running from south to north. The Lujenda rises in proximity to Lake Chilwa, in the small Lake Chiuta (520 m, 1,700 ft), the swamps to the south of this being separated from Chilwa only by a narrow wooded ridge. The stream which issues from Chiuta passes by a swampy valley into the narrow Lake Amaramba, from which the Lujenda River finally issues as a stream 80 yards (73 m) wide.

Lower down it varies greatly in breadth, containing in many parts long wooded islands which rise above the flood level, and are often inhabited. The river is fordable in many places in the dry season. At its mouth it is about 1 mile (1.6 km) wide.

The lower Ruvuma, which is often 1/2 mile (0.8 km) wide but generally shallow, flows through a swampy valley flanked by plateau escarpments containing several small backwaters of the river. The mouth is near 10° 28′ S, 40° 30′ E, the boundary near the coast being formed by the parallel of 10° 40′ S. The length of the Ruvuma is about 500 miles (800 km).

== Bridge ==
A bridge called Unity Bridge across the river between Mozambique and Tanzania was proposed as early as 1975, and although construction was started, the project was abandoned due to lack of funds. In 2002 the two national governments made a formal agreement to build a new 600 metre bridge across the river, and this was finally opened in a ceremony on 25 May 2010. The bridge is located at Negomano, 200 km (120 mi) inland and 100 km (62 mi) from the nearest surfaced road in Mozambique. The site was agreed between Presidents Machel and Nyerere because this was the site of the first entry into Mozambique by Frelimo forces in the Mozambican War of Independence on 25 September 1964. Negomano was also the location where the German forces crossed the Rovuma river on 25 November 1917. First foundation stones were laid on the Tanzanian and Mozambique sides on October 10, 2005. Construction was completed early 2010 and cost US$28 million. It used to be possible to cross the river with rafts (located at the Tanzanian side) that could carry 3 jeeps. The ferry sank in 2008 and has not been replaced. At low water the river is sometimes fordable with a good 4-wheel drive.

A smaller bridge called Unity Two was also completed in 2007 on the upper Rovuma close to Matchedge in Niassa Province.
