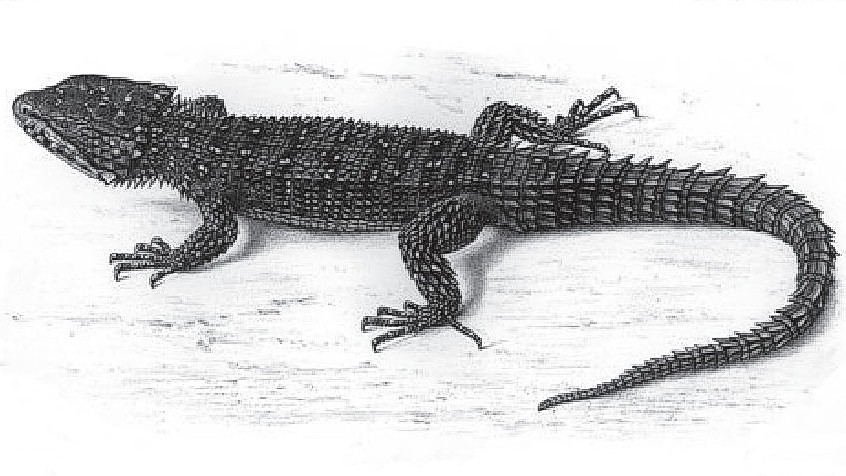

Conservation status
- Least Concern (IUCN 3.1)

Scientific classification
- Kingdom: Animalia
- Phylum: Chordata
- Class: Reptilia
- Order: Squamata
- Family: Cordylidae
- Genus: Smaug
- Species: S. warreni

Binomial name
- Smaug warreni (Boulenger, 1908)

Synonyms
- Zonurus warreni Boulenger, 1908; Cordylus warreni — V. FitzSimons, 1943; Smaug warreni — Stanley et al., 2011

= Warren's girdled lizard =

Species of lizard

Warren's girdled lizard (Smaug warreni) is a species of relatively large, flattened lizard in the family Cordylidae. The species is native to Southern Africa.

== Etymology ==
The specific name, warreni, is in honour of British zoologist Ernest Warren (1871–1945), who collected the holotype.

== Geographic range ==
S. warreni is known from Botswana, Mozambique, and South Africa (the Lebombo Mountains in northeastern South Africa and eastern Eswatini).

== Habitat ==
The preferred natural habitats of S. warreni are savanna and rock outcrops on wooded mountain slopes, at altitudes of 300–800 m (980–2,620 ft).

== Diet ==
A shy species, S. warreni eats large arthropods and small vertebrates.

== Description ==
S. warreni has a snout-to-vent length (SVL) of 105–130 mm (4.1–5.1 in). The back is dark brown with small yellow spots forming bands. The belly is light brown, and the throat and lips are mottled. Males have 10-12 femoral pores. The tail is spiny and slightly longer than the SVL.

== Reproduction ==
S. warreni is ovoviviparous.

== Taxonomy ==
The Barberton girdled lizard (Smaug barbertonensis), Waterberg girdled lizard (Smaug breyeri), Zoutpansberg girdled lizard (Smaug depressus), Mozambique girdled lizard (Smaug mossambicus), and the regal girdled lizard (Smaug regius) were formerly considered subspecies of Warren's girdled lizard.

== Pet trade ==
Warren's girdled lizard was formerly available in the pet trade, possibly exported from Mozambique. Most specimens were labeled Cordylus warreni depressus and should be considered Smaug depressus.
