= 1923 in South Africa =

- Decades: 1900s; 1910s; 1920s; 1930s; 1940s
- See also: List of years in South Africa

The following lists events that happened during 1923 in South Africa.

== Incumbents ==
- Monarch: King George V.
- Governor-General and High Commissioner for Southern Africa:
  - Prince Arthur of Connaught (until 5 December).
  - Sir James Rose Innes (acting, from 5 December).
- Prime Minister: Jan Smuts.
- Chief Justice: Sir James Rose Innes.

== Events ==
March

- 1 – The Electricity Supply Commission (Eskom), largest electricity producer in Africa, is established.

Unknown date

- The South African Native National Congress changes its name to African National Congress.

== Births ==
- 10 April – John Watkins, cricketer (d. 2021)
- 30 April – Francis Tucker, rally Driver. (d. 2008)
- 19 May – Johannes Meintjes, artist and writer. (d. 1980)
- 6 August – Moira Lister, South African-born English film, stage and television actress. (d. 2007)
- 5 October – Glynis Johns, South African-born Welsh actress. (d. 2024)
- 11 October – Moses Mabhida, anti-apartheid activist. (d. 1986)
- 11 November – Pieter van der Byl, politician (d. 1999)
- 20 November – Nadine Gordimer, writer and political activist. (d. 2014)
- 17 December – Wilton Mkwayi, anti-apartheid activist. (d. 2004)

== Deaths ==
- 10 October – Herman Gottfried Breijer, Dutch-born South African naturalist

== Railways ==
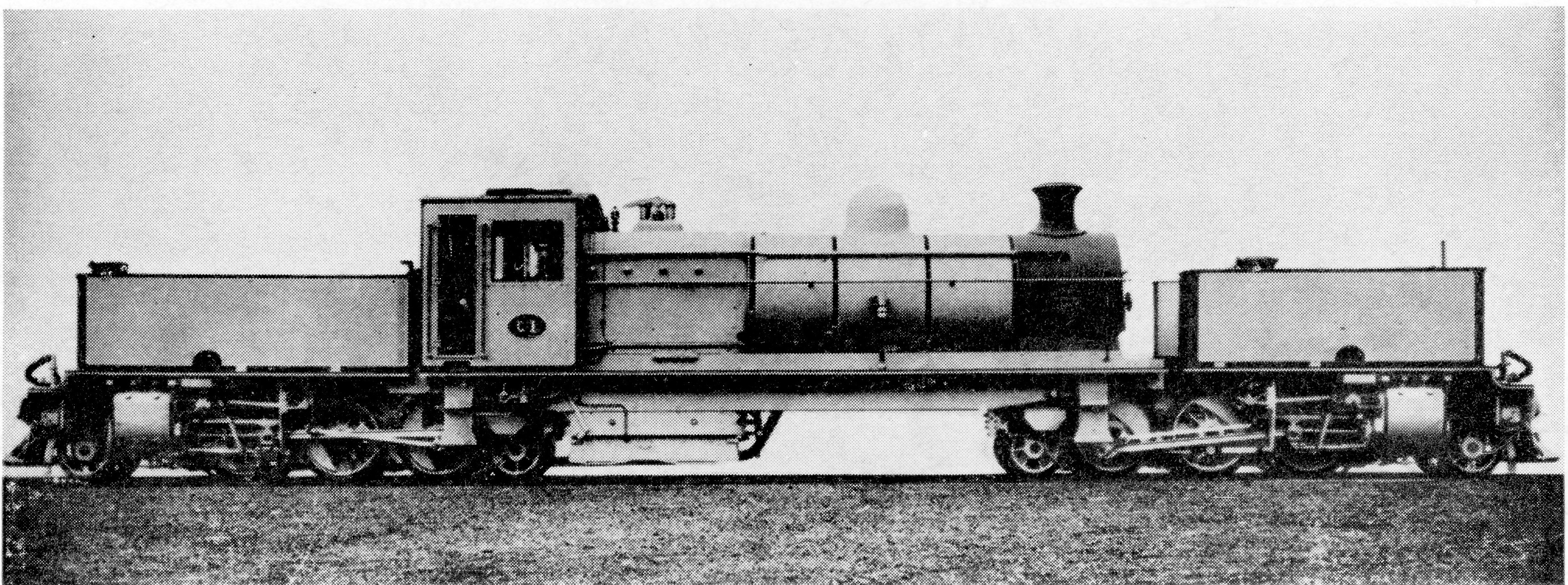
Class GK

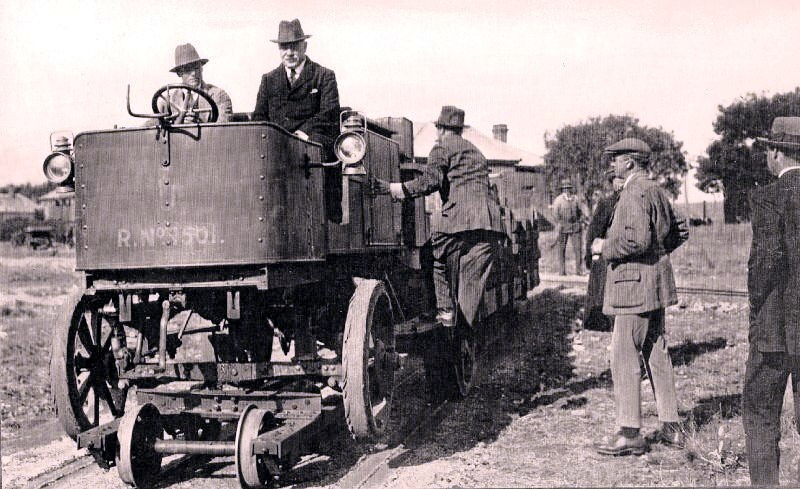
Road-rail tractor prototype

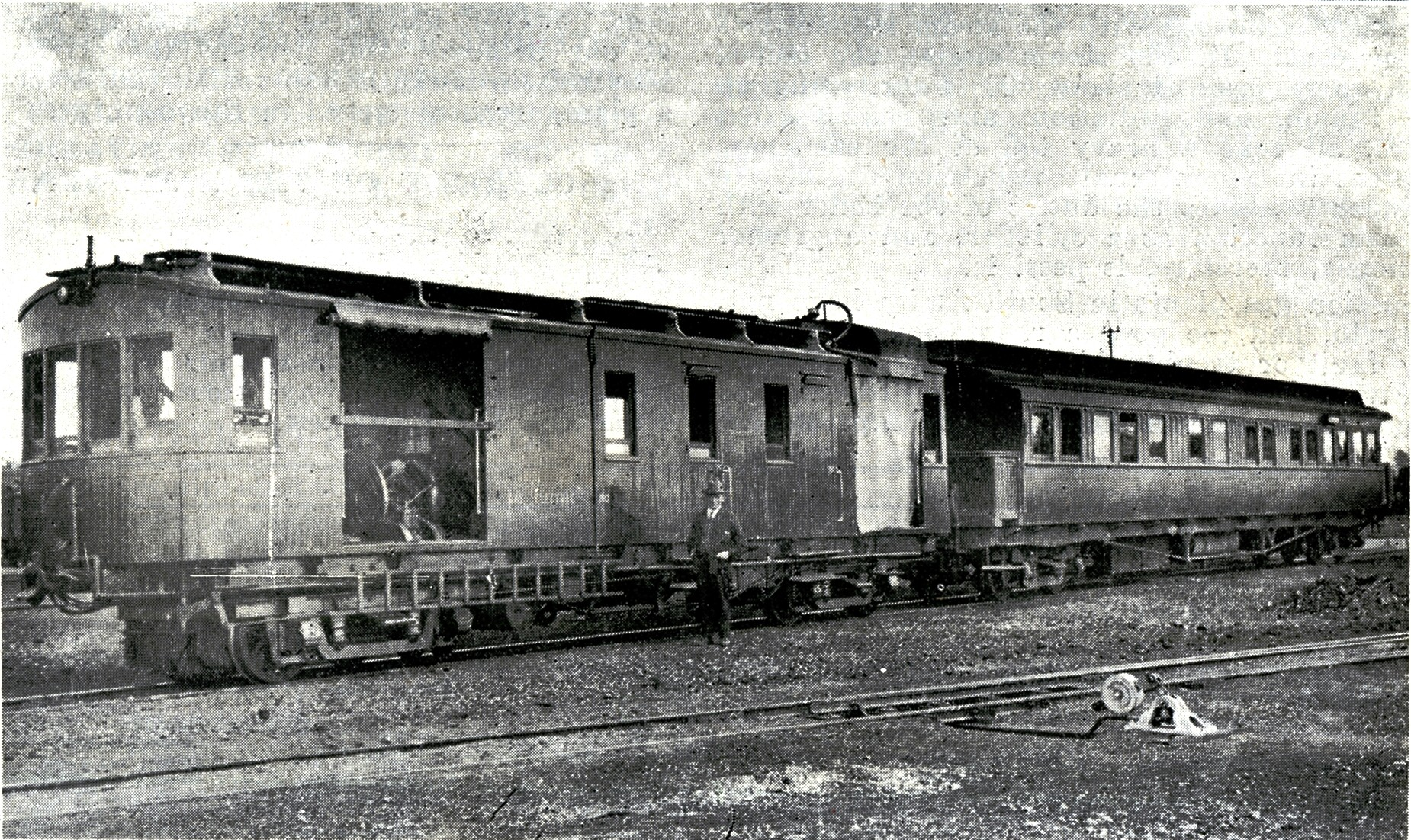
Gas-electric locomotive

=== Railway lines opened ===
- 12 April – Transvaal – Dunswart to Apex deviation, 4 miles 16 chains (6.8 kilometres).
- 21 May – Natal – Queen's Bridge to Duff's Road deviation, 5 miles 55 chains (9.2 kilometres).
- 8 July – Natal – Canelands, Umdloti to Maidstone deviation, 6 miles 74 chains (11.1 kilometres).
- 6 August – Cape – Kamfersdam to Winter's Rush, 34 miles 29 chains (55.3 kilometres).
- 9 August – Cape – Belmont to Douglas, 53 miles 22 chains (85.7 kilometres).
- 30 October – Transvaal – Settlers to Tuinplaas, 13 miles 22 chains (21.4 kilometres).

=== Locomotives ===
- The New Cape Central Railway places two 2-6-2+2-6-2 Double Prairie type Garratt articulated steam locomotives in service. They will be designated Class GK on the South African Railways (SAR) in 1925.
- Major Frank Dutton, SAR Signal Engineer and the Motor Transport Superintendent, conducts trials with a prototype petrol-paraffin powered Dutton road-rail tractor.
- Mr. C. Lawson, Superintendent Mechanical of the SAR, experiments with gas-electric motive power and constructs a single experimental producer gas-electric locomotive. The locomotive remains in service for several years but the gas-electric concept will eventually be superseded by diesel-electric traction.
