= Locomotive Duplex =

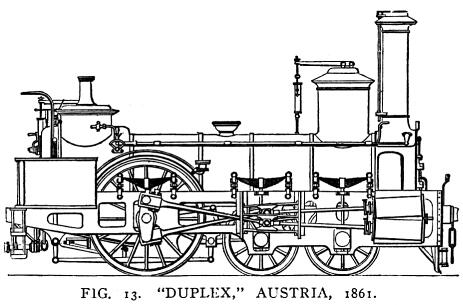
Type and origin
- Power type: Steam
- Designer: John Haswell
- Builder: Austrian State Railway Works, Vienna
- Build date: 1861
Specifications
- Configuration
  - Whyte: 4-2-0
- Gauge: 4 ft 8 1/2 in (1,435 mm) standard gauge
- Driver dia.: 7 ft 9 in (2,362 mm)
- Cylinders: Four
- Cylinder size: 10.8 in × 24.8 in (274 mm × 630 mm)

Locomotive Duplex was an experimental 4-cylinder steam locomotive designed by John Haswell of the Austrian State Railway Works at Vienna and built in 1861. It was exhibited at the 1862 International Exhibition and was then used on the line from Prague to Podmokly (part of Děčín today) where it worked till 1900. Prague was the capital of Bohemia, at that time part of the Austro-Hungarian Empire.

== Overview ==
This 4-2-0 locomotive was the last of 12 engines of the same type. Only this one was equipped with 2 cylinders on each side. The angle between the crankpins on one side was 180° with the pistons going opposite directions. There was one common valve gear with crossed steam channels. The angle between the pairs of engines on each side was normal at 90°.

== Purpose ==
The main idea was to eliminate dynamic forces. This was successfully exhibited when the locomotive was hung on chains. It silently simulated a run at maximum speed (60 km/h) without swinging.

== See also ==
- Imperial Royal Austrian State Railways

== Sources ==
- Jindřich Bek: Atlas Lokomotiv - historické lokomotivy, page 94, NADAS Prague 1979
