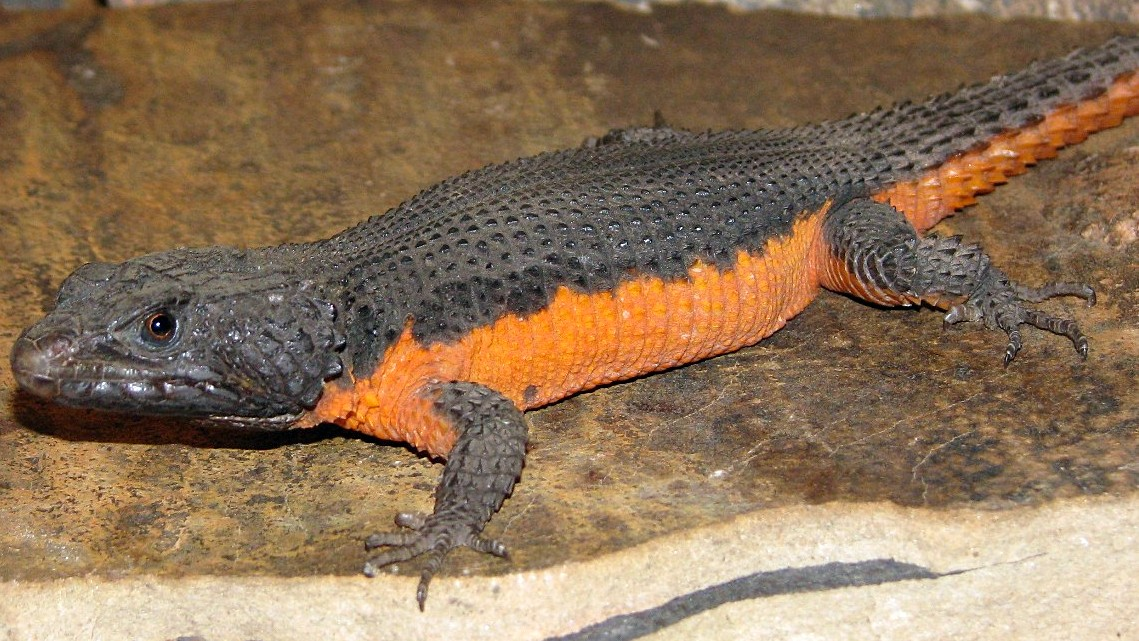
- Male Smaug mossambicus

Conservation status
- Least Concern (IUCN 3.1)

Scientific classification
- Kingdom: Animalia
- Phylum: Chordata
- Class: Reptilia
- Order: Squamata
- Family: Cordylidae
- Genus: Smaug
- Species: S. mossambicus

Binomial name
- Smaug mossambicus (Fitzsimons, 1958)

Synonyms
- Cordylus mossambicus Fitzsimons, 1958

= Mozambique girdled lizard =

Species of lizard

The Mozambique girdled lizard or flame-bellied armadillo lizard (Smaug mossambicus) is a large, flattened, girdled lizard found on Mount Gorongosa in Mozambique and low elevations in the Chimanimani Mountains at the border of Zimbabwe and Mozambique. It lives in rock outcrops in grasslands and dry, wooded mountain slopes.

The Mozambique girdled lizard is also called the Gorongosa girdled lizard or Cordylus gorongosa (not a valid taxon name). Individuals are exported through Mozambique for the pet trade. They eat a wide variety of small insects (especially beetles and grasshoppers), millipedes, spiders, and occasional small vertebrates.

== Description ==
Mozambique girdled lizards reach 137.5 mm from snout to vent and 281 mm in total length (based on a captive individual). Males are dark brown to black above with bright orange undersides and black throats. Females and juveniles are dark brown above with small cream spots scattered on the neck and back. The bellies and sides are gray with orange and black mottles on the lower jaws and throat.

Males are distinguished from the closely related regal girdled lizard (Smaug regius) by the black chin and throat (yellow chin, mottled throat in S. regius) and the presence of a brown patch in front of the cloaca on the belly. Females and juveniles of S. regius and S. mossambicus are nearly identical. In S. regius, their heads are pale brown. Both species were once considered to be subspecies of the Warren's girdled lizard (Smaug warreni).

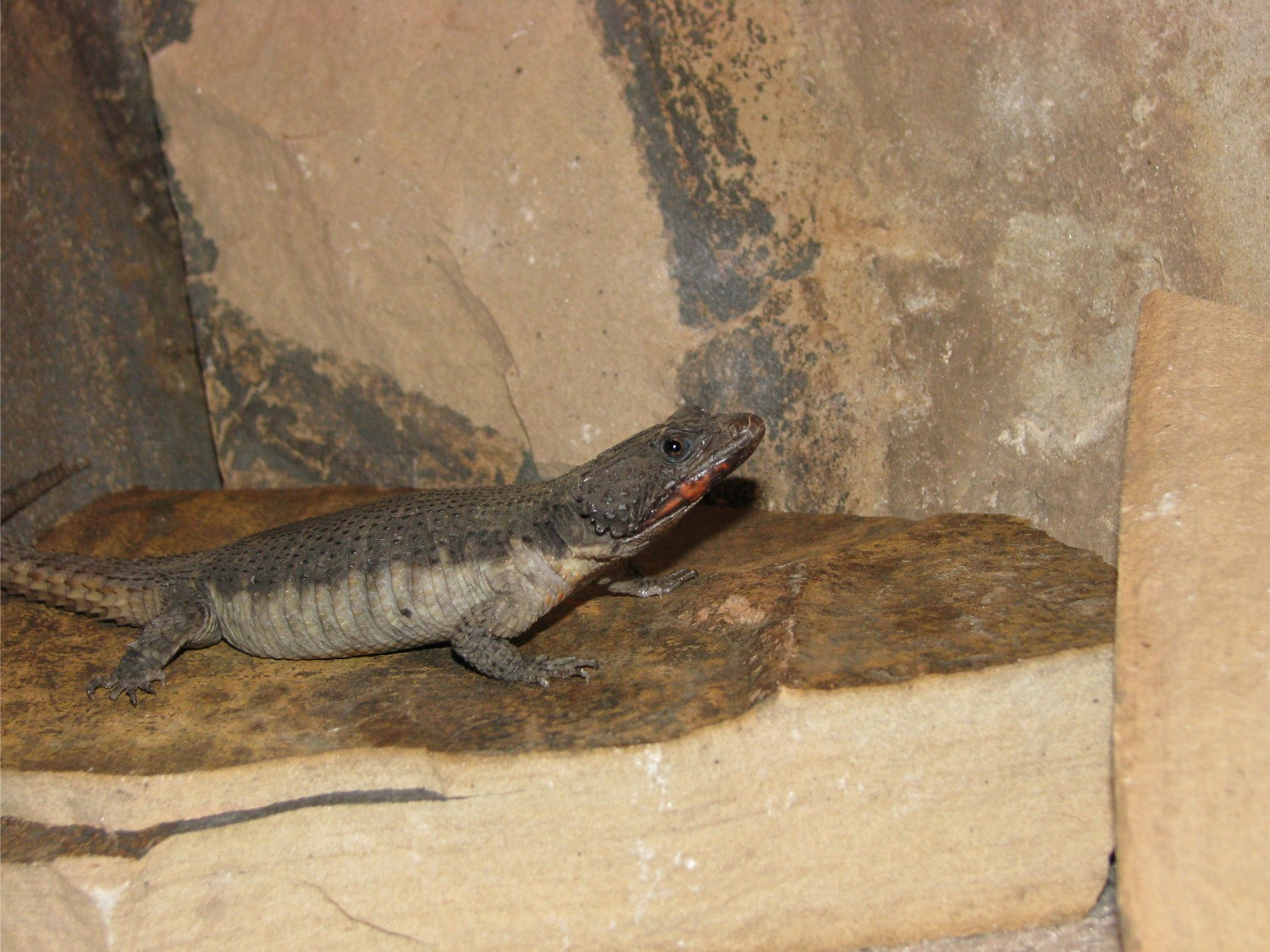
Female Smaug mossambicus
