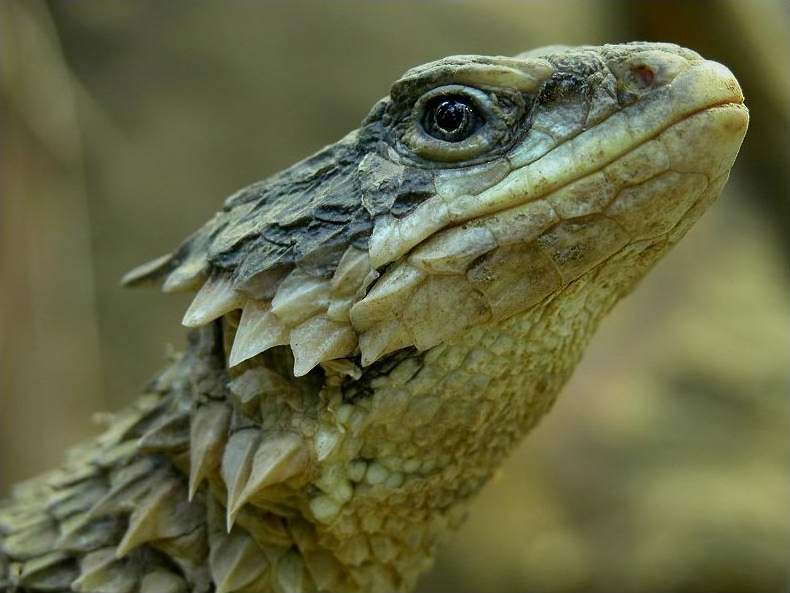

Conservation status
- Vulnerable (IUCN 3.1)

Scientific classification
- Kingdom: Animalia
- Phylum: Chordata
- Class: Reptilia
- Order: Squamata
- Family: Cordylidae
- Genus: Smaug
- Species: S. giganteus

Binomial name
- Smaug giganteus (Smith, 1844)
- Giant dragon lizard IUCN range (2021) in the Highveld

Synonyms
- Cordylus giganteus Smith 1844; Zonurus giganteus Boulenger 1885

= Giant girdled lizard =

Sungazer

Species of reptiles

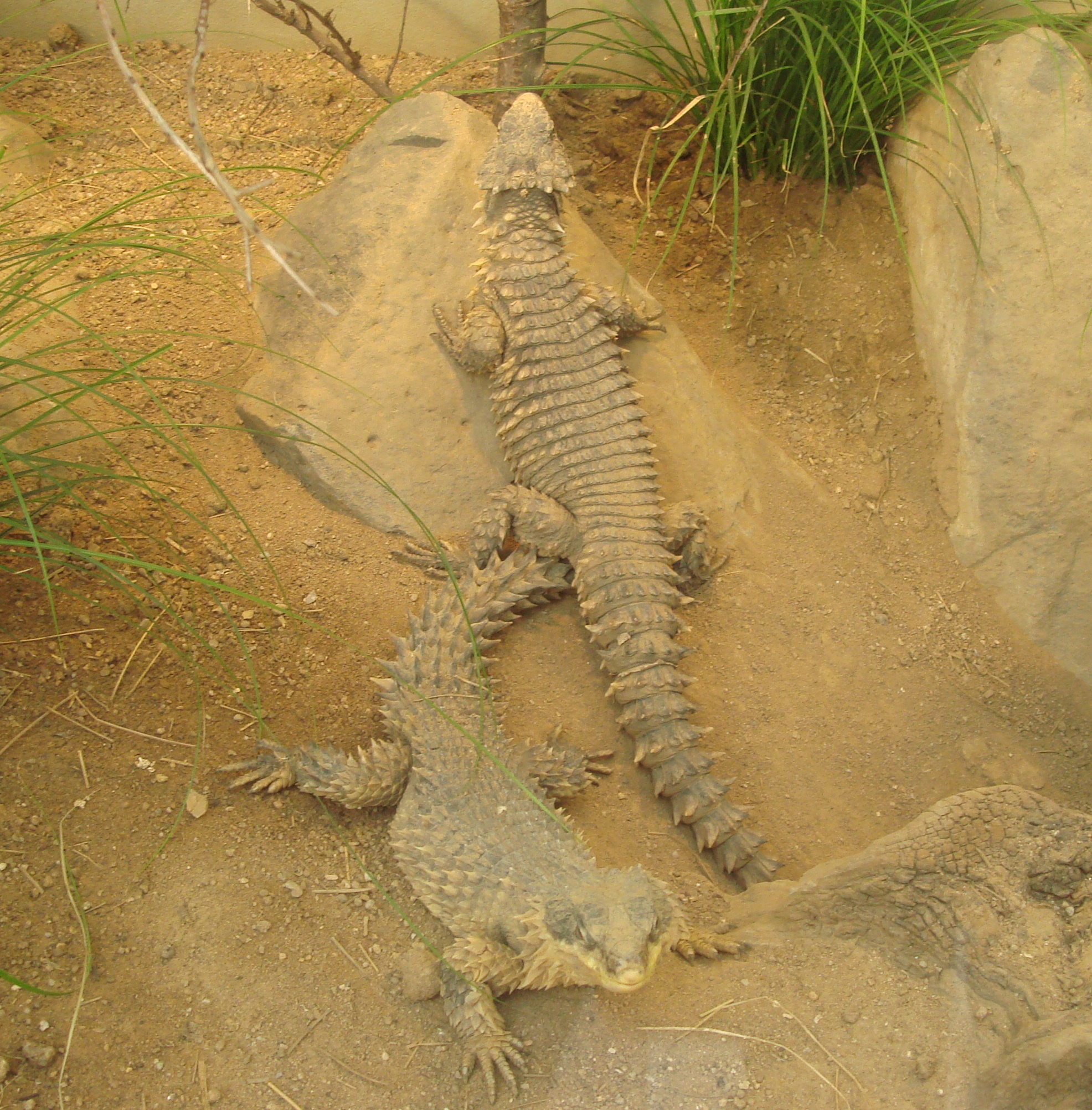
Two giant girdled lizards at the Frankfurt Zoo

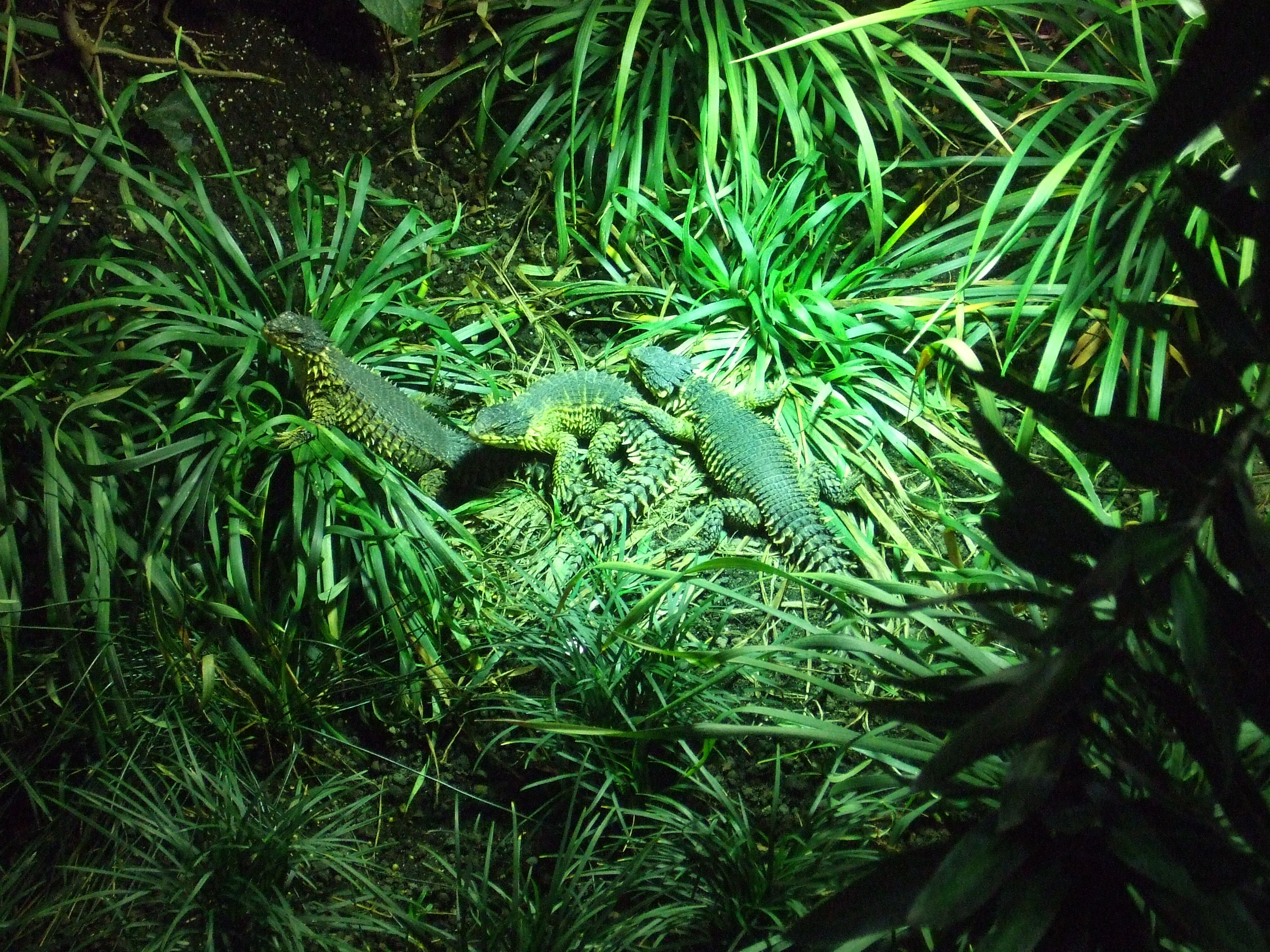
Three giant girdled lizards in Tierpark Hagenbeck

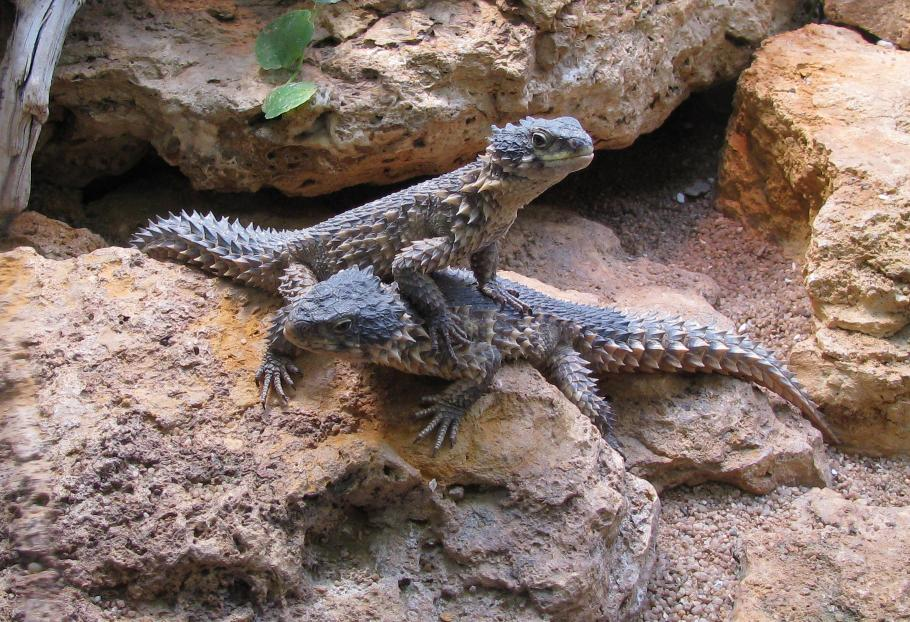
A pair of giant girdled lizards

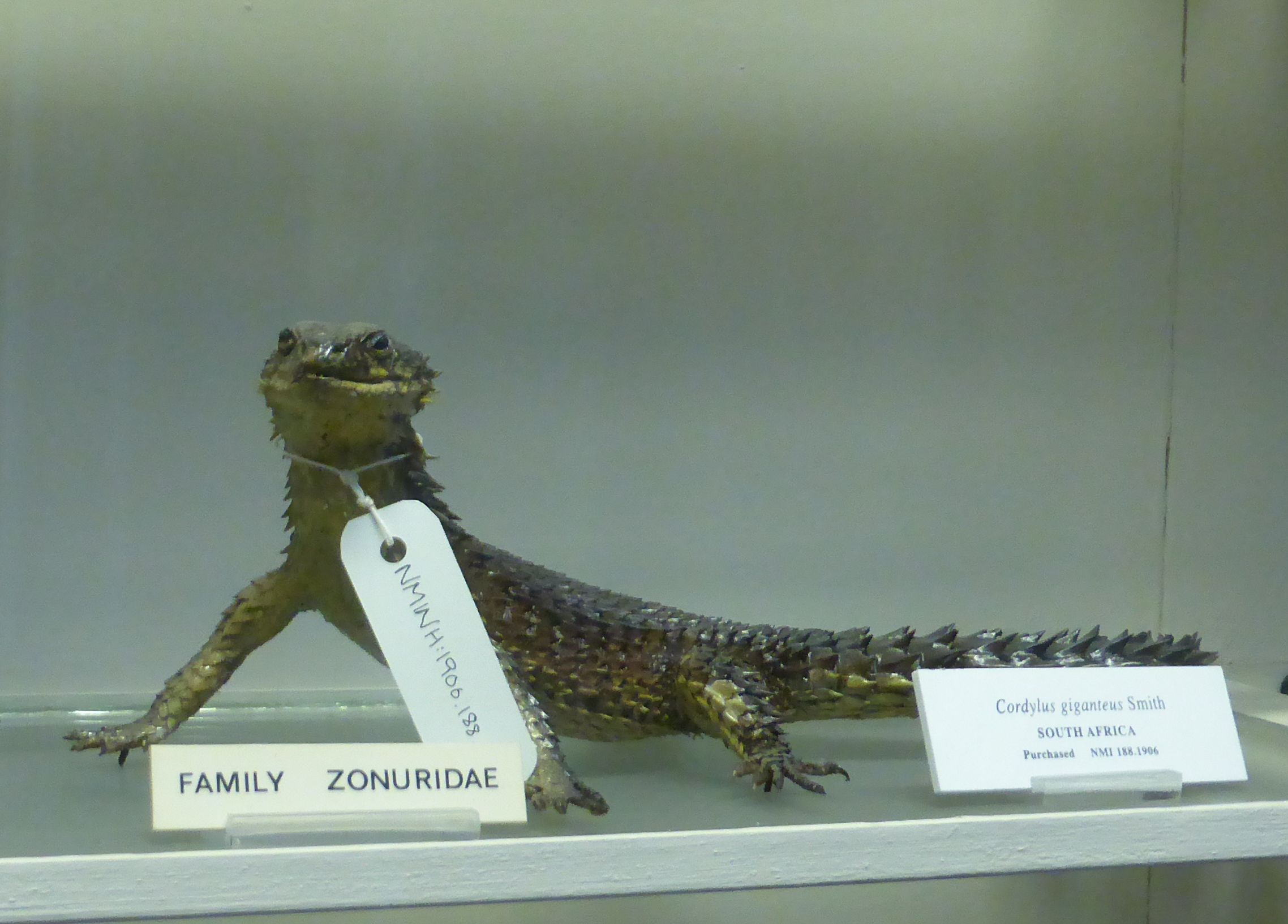
Giant girdled lizard specimen, purchased in 1906 by National Museum of Ireland - Natural History

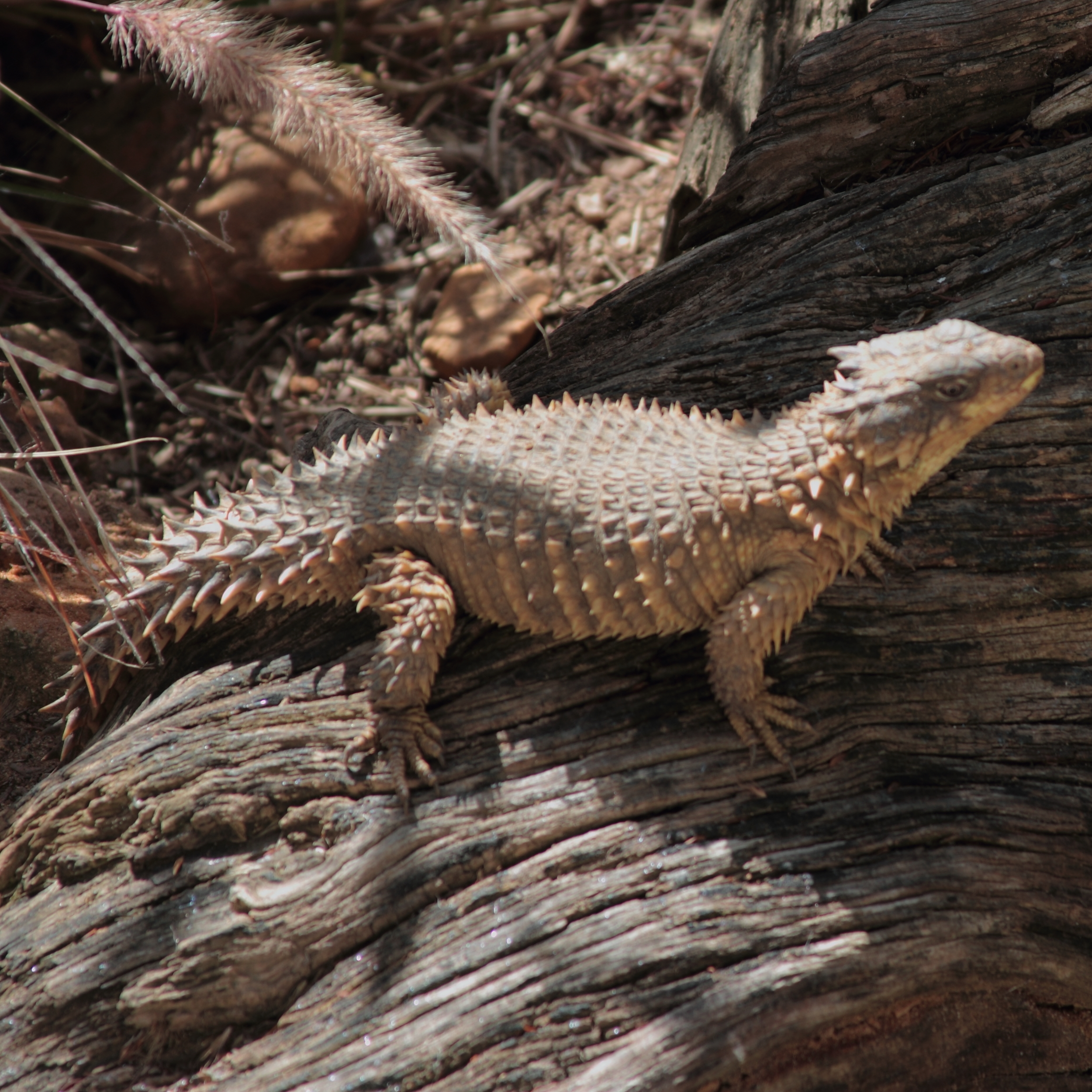
Giant girdled lizard at the San Diego Zoo

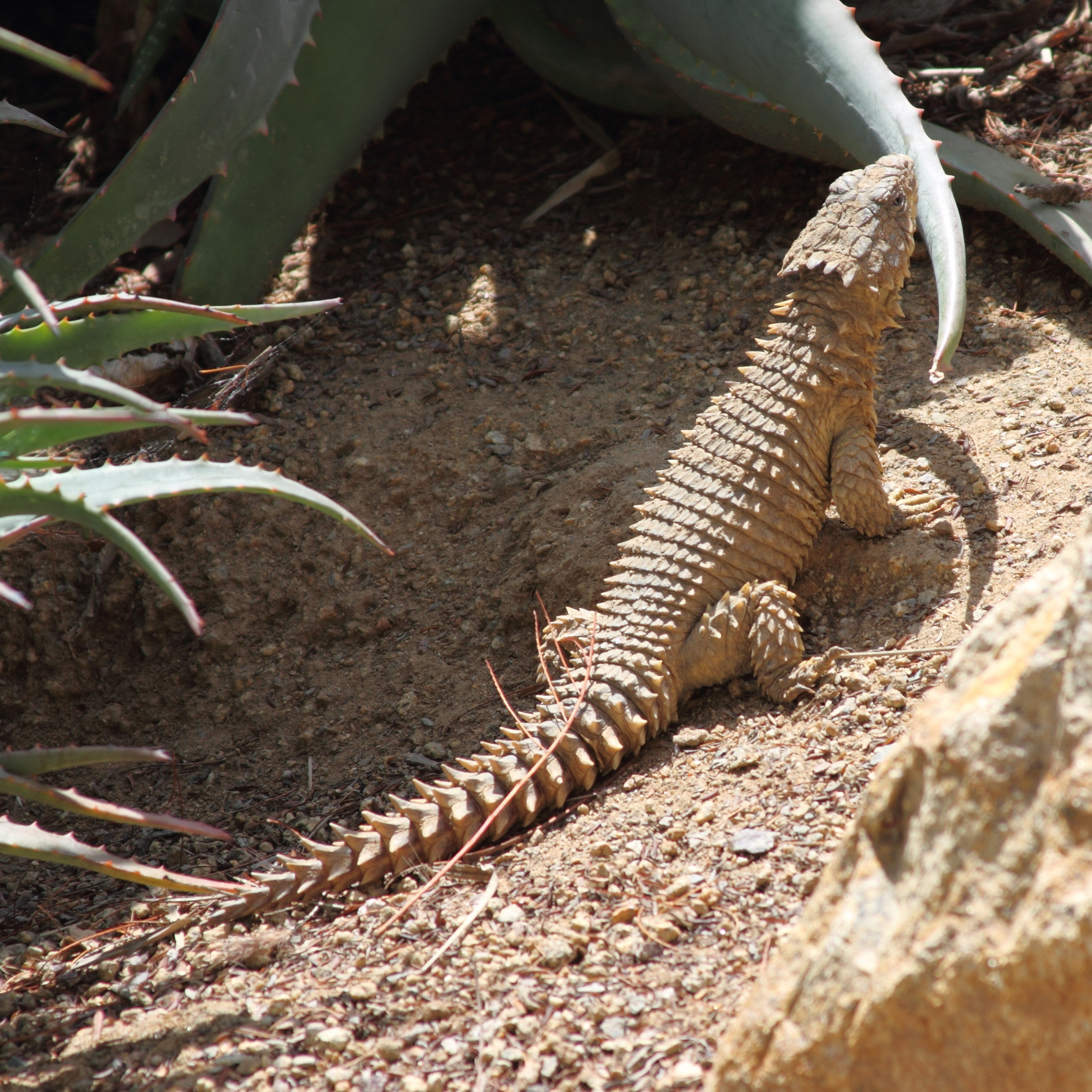
Giant girdled lizard at the San Diego Zoo

The sungazer (Smaug giganteus, syn. Cordylus giganteus), also known as the giant girdled lizard, giant dragon lizard, ouvolk, or giant zonure, is the largest species of the Cordylidae, a family of lizards from Sub-Saharan Africa. This threatened species is endemic to Highveld grasslands in the interior of South Africa. In 2011, it was assigned to the new genus Smaug, along with seven other species previously belonging to the genus Cordylus, based on a comprehensive molecular phylogeny of the Cordylidae.

== Appearance ==
The sungazer is a heavily armoured species, with a typical snout–to-vent length of 15–18 cm (5.9–7.1 in) (exceptionally up to 20.5 cm or 8.1 in), and is easily distinguishable from other cordylids by the elongated pair of occipital spines and the enlarged keeled caudal spines.

== Names ==
The species is known as the sungazer because of its distinctive thermoregulatory behaviour of elevating the anterior parts of the body by extending its fore limbs, usually near the entrance of its burrow as if looking at the sun. The species is well known throughout its distribution, and is called by several different common names, in different languages. The most common local name is ouvolk, given by Afrikaans landowners who liken the thermoregulatory basking position of the species to retired farmworkers, who spend much of their days sitting in the sunlight. The sungazer is also known ubiquitously as Pathakalle by Sotho-speaking people and mbedla by Zulu-speaking people.

== Behaviour ==
Unlike most other rupicolous (living among rocks) members of the Cordylidae, sungazers live in self-excavated burrows (typically 0.4 m or 1.3 ft deep, and 1.8 m or 6 ft long) in the silty soil of the Themeda grassland in South Africa. They are insectivores, but occasionally eat small vertebrates. These colonial, ovoviviparous lizards reproduce every 2–3 years, and only produce one or two offspring per breeding cycle. They are long-lived, and captives have been recorded surpassing 20 years of age.

== Reproduction ==
Sungazers are ovoviviparous; embryos develop within eggs, but the eggs are retained by the female until they are ready to hatch. Some females skip breeding seasons depending on their physical condition and environmental factors; as a result, sungazers typically reproduce biennally (every two years). Fecundity is low in C. giganteus, and clutch sizes are limited to one or two individuals.

C. giganteus offspring shelter communally in the same burrow as their mother, which is thought to boost survival by offering extra protection from predators and adverse environmental conditions.

== Conservation ==
The decline in sungazer numbers is a result of habitat destruction, and illegal collecting for the pet and traditional medicine trades. Entire colonies can disappear when a patch of native grassland is converted to farmland or otherwise "developed".

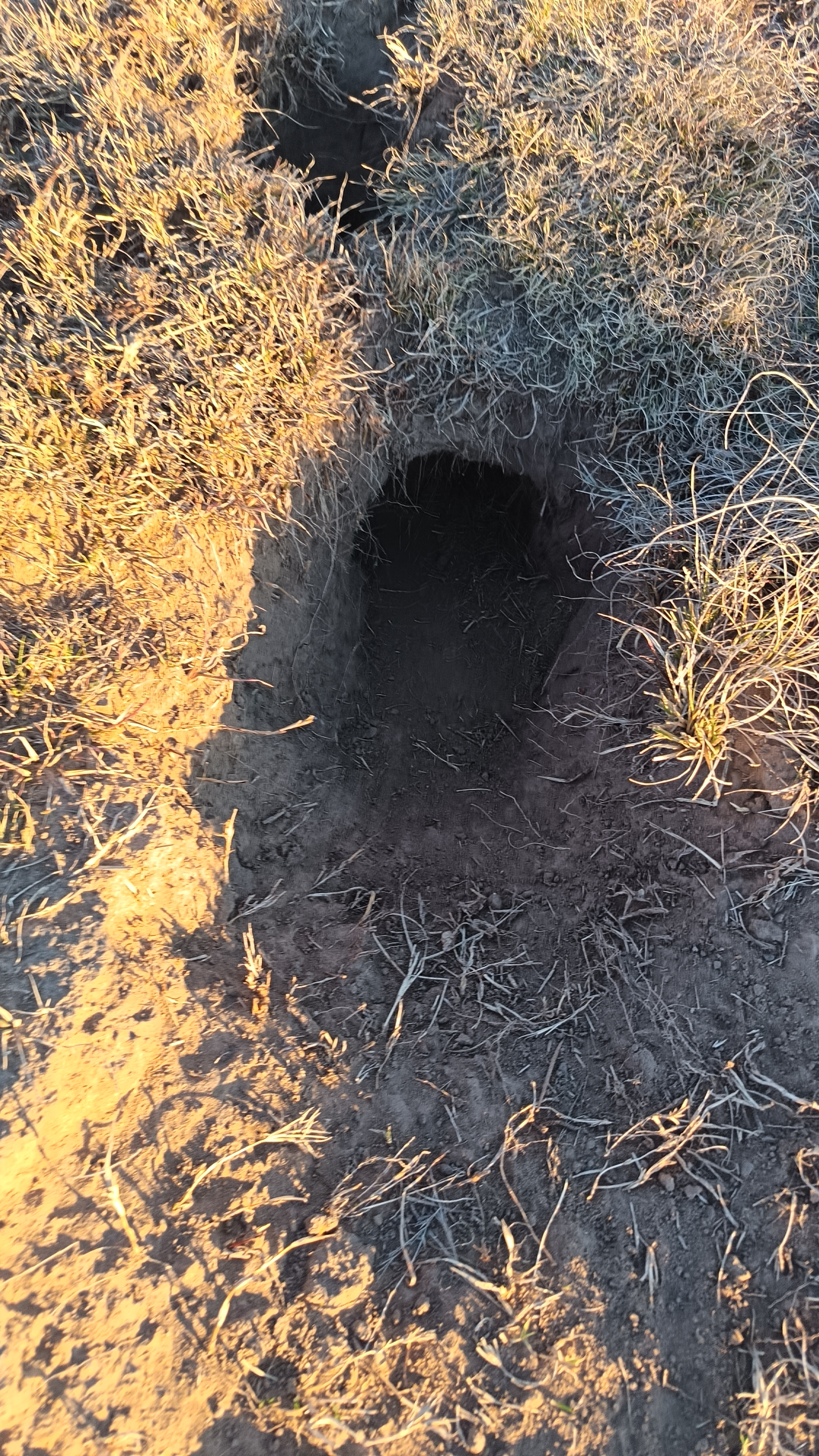
Giant girdled lizard burrow, Petrus Steyn, Free State.

Sungazers are very difficult to breed in captivity, and successes have only been reported by a few places worldwide. At least some reports are likely not true captive breeding, but rather pregnant females being caught in the wild and subsequently giving birth in captivity. Wild-caught sungazers are then imported from South Africa to the US, Europe, and Japan, where they command high prices. Most of these animals are smuggled out of the country and are not accompanied by the CITES permits required in legal exports/imports of the species. In its native South Africa, possessing a sungazer (dead or alive) without a permit is illegal. Cordylus tropidosternum and Cordylus jonesii are occasionally marketed as "dwarf sungazers".

== Cultural references ==
- The video game Sonic Superstars has a character called Trip that is based on a sungazer.
