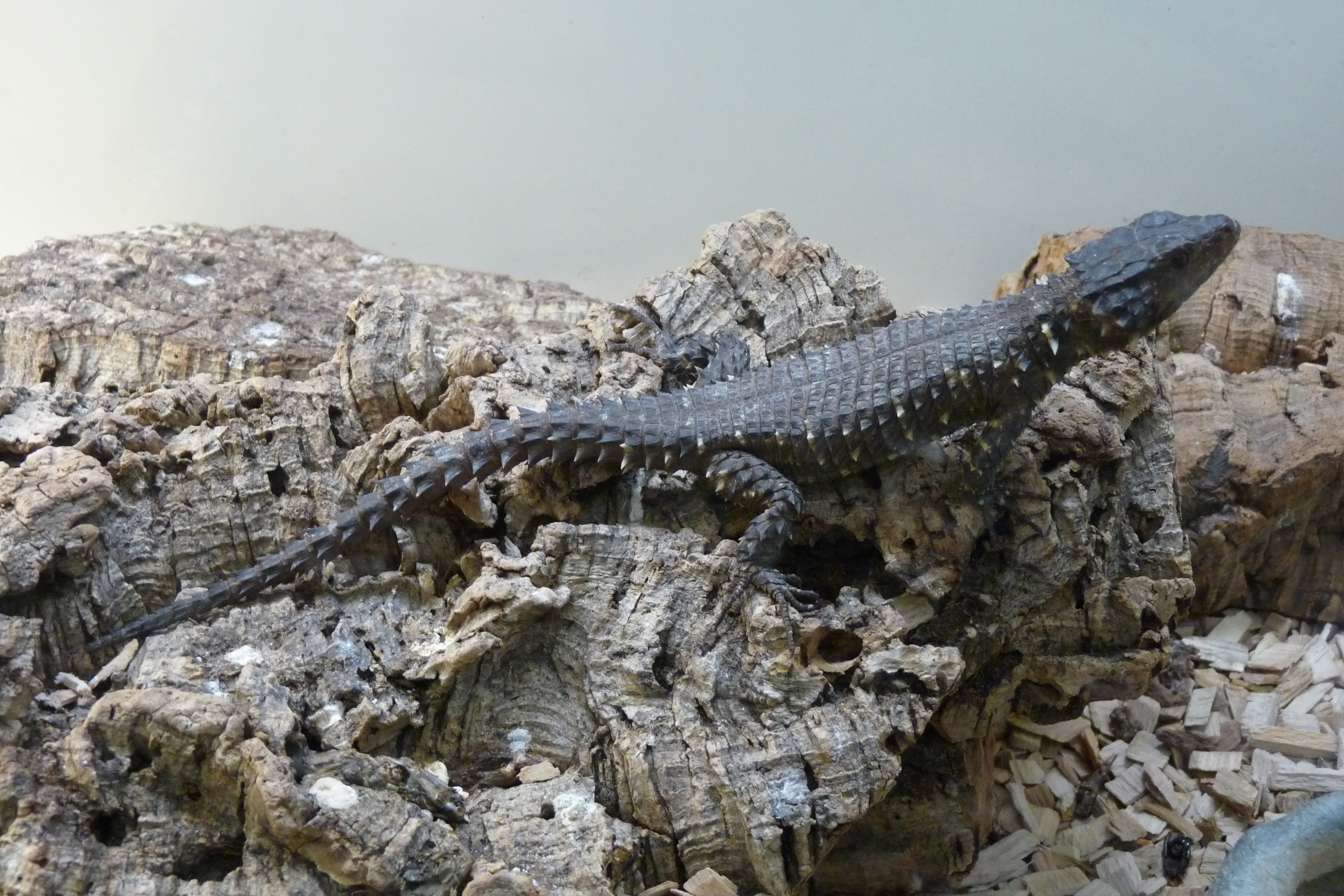

Conservation status
- Least Concern (IUCN 3.1)

Scientific classification
- Kingdom: Animalia
- Phylum: Chordata
- Class: Reptilia
- Order: Squamata
- Family: Cordylidae
- Genus: Smaug
- Species: S. vandami

Binomial name
- Smaug vandami (FitzSimons, 1930)

Synonyms
- Zonurus vandami FitzSimons, 1930; Cordylus vandami — FitzSimons, 1943; Cordylus warreni vandami — Loveridge, 1944; Smaug vandami — Stanley et al., 2011

= Van Dam's girdled lizard =

Species of lizard

Van Dam's girdled lizard (Smaug vandami) is a species of lizard in the family Cordylidae. The species is endemic to South Africa.

== Geographic range ==
The type locality of S. vandami is Gravelotte, Limpopo, South Africa.

== Habitat ==
The preferred natural habitats of S. vandami are grassland and savanna.

== Description ==
A large lizard, S. vandami may attain a snout-vent length (SVL) of 14.5 cm (5.7 in). It has a triangular shaped head, and spiny dorsal scales. The predominant colour is dark brown with fragmented yellow rings.

== Behaviour ==
S. vandami is largely solitary and hides in cracks in rocks.

== Reproduction ==
S. vandami is ovoviviparous. From two to six young are born alive in summer.

== Etymology ==
The species is named for the collector of the type specimens, Gerhardus Petrus Frederick van Dam (died 1927), who was a South African herpetologist.

== Common names ==
Other common names for S. vandami include the Afrikaans name ouvolk, meaning "old folk".
