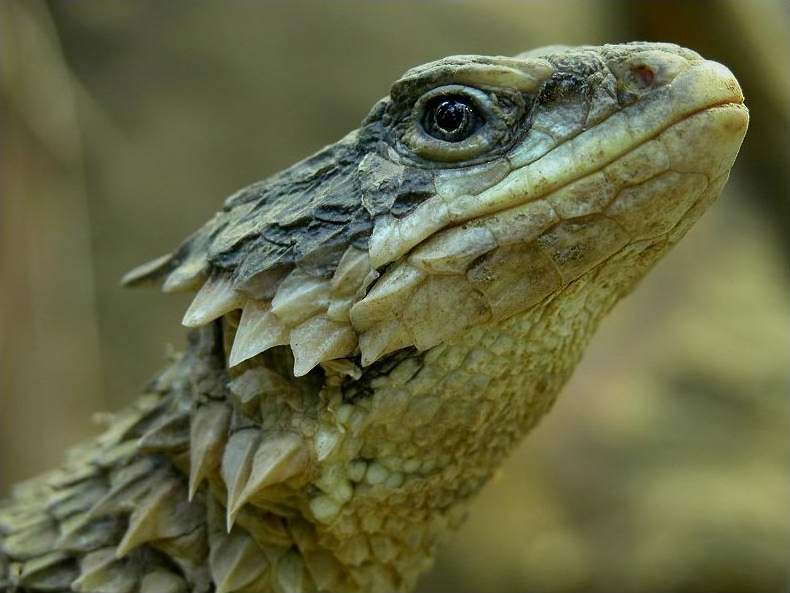
- Giant girdled lizard (Smaug giganteus)

Scientific classification
- Kingdom: Animalia
- Phylum: Chordata
- Class: Reptilia
- Order: Squamata
- Family: Cordylidae
- Genus: Smaug; Stanley, Bauer, Jackman, Branch, & Mouton, 2011

Diversity
- 9 species (see text)

= Smaug (lizard) =

Genus of lizards

Smaug is a genus of lizards in the family Cordylidae. The genus Smaug is a group of species of spiny southern African lizards, separated from the genus Cordylus in 2011 on the basis of a comprehensive molecular phylogeny of the Cordylidae. The type species is the giant girdled lizard, S. giganteus (formerly Cordylus giganteus).

== Etymology ==
The genus Smaug was named for the character Smaug, in J. R. R. Tolkien's The Hobbit:

Smaug is the name of the dragon encountered by Bilbo Baggins, the protagonist of J.R.R. Tolkien's book The Hobbit. According to Tolkien the name is derived from the Old German verb smeugen – to squeeze through a hole. Like the type species, Smaug lived underground and was heavily armored. Appropriately Tolkien was born in the Free State province, South Africa, the core area of distribution of the type species. The name is masculine.

Zonurus, the former genus name, is from Greek zōnē 'girdle' + oura 'tail'.

== Description ==
Smaug are large lizards (extremely large among the Cordylidae), measuring up to 112–205 mm (4.4–8.1 in) in snout–vent length (SVL). The body is sub-cylindrical in cross-section and robust. Limbs are moderate in length and digits are unreduced. Dorsal and caudal scales are enlarged and spinose. Occipital spines are greatly enlarged. Nasal scales are not in contact with one another. The frontonasal scale is in broad contact with the rostral scale. The tongue is partly or fully pigmented. Osteoderms are distributed across the entire body.

== Reproduction ==
Smaug are viviparous and give birth to 1–6 young.

== Species ==
There are 9 species:

- Smaug barbertonensis (Van Dam, 1921) – Barberton girdled lizard
- Smaug breyeri (Van Dam, 1921) – Waterberg girdled lizard
- Smaug depressus (V. FitzSimons, 1930) – Zoutpansberg girdled lizard
- Smaug giganteus (A. Smith, 1844) – giant girdled lizard (type species)
- Smaug mossambicus (V. FitzSimons, 1958) – Mozambique girdled lizard
- Smaug regius (Broadley, 1962) – regal girdled lizard
- Smaug swazicus Bates & Stanley, 2020 – Swazi dragon lizard
- Smaug vandami (V. FitzSimons, 1930) – Van Dam's girdled lizard
- Smaug warreni (Boulenger, 1908) – Warren's girdled lizard

Nota bene: A binomial authority in parentheses indicates that the species was originally described in a genus other than Smaug.
