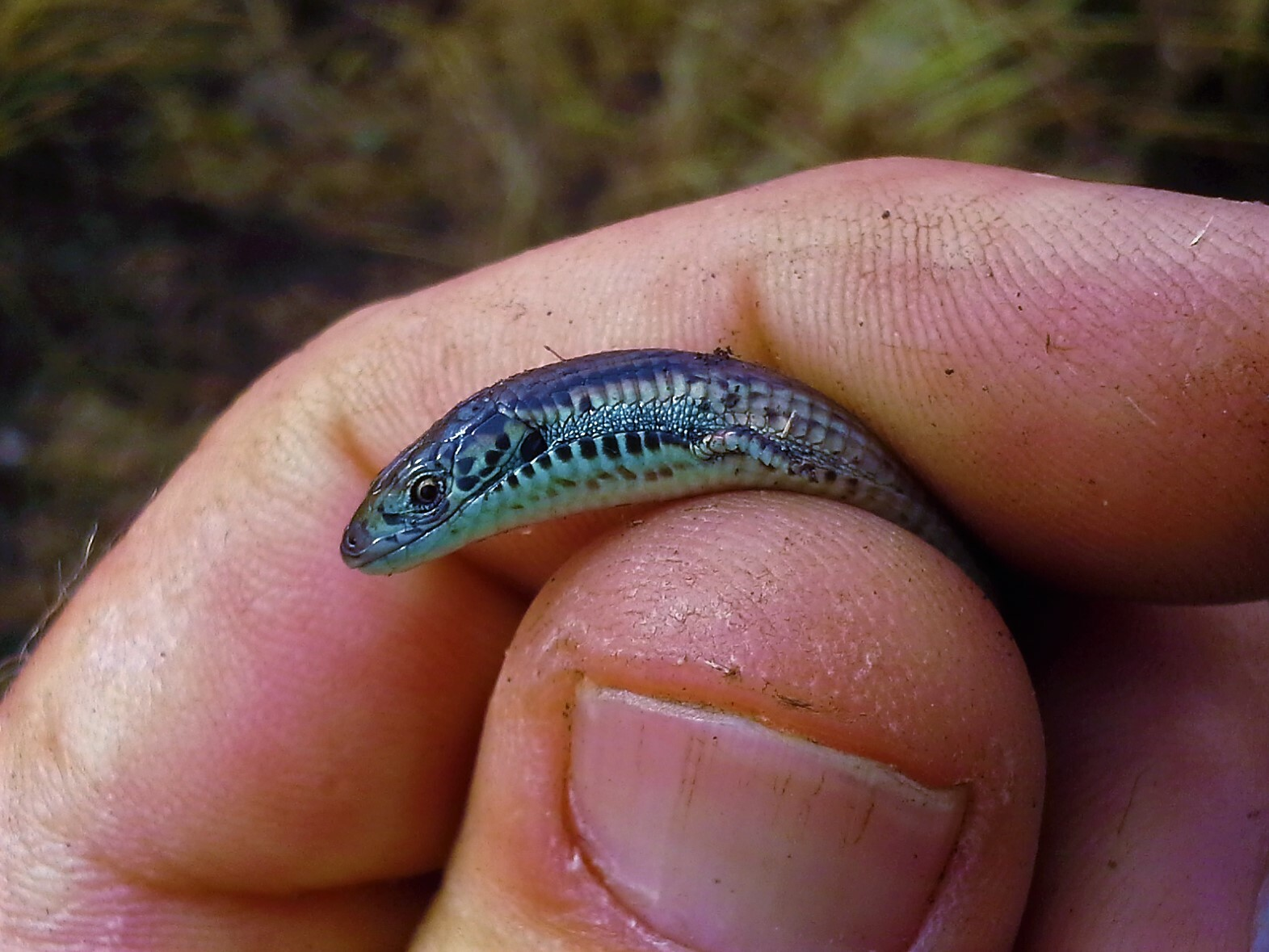

Conservation status
- Near Threatened (IUCN 3.1)

Scientific classification
- Kingdom: Animalia
- Phylum: Chordata
- Class: Reptilia
- Order: Squamata
- Family: Gerrhosauridae
- Genus: Tetradactylus
- Species: T. breyeri

Binomial name
- Tetradactylus breyeri Roux, 1907

= Breyer's long-tailed seps =

Species of lizard

Tetradactylus breyeri, commonly known as Breyer's long-tailed seps or Breyer's whip lizard, is a species of lizard in the family Gerrhosauridae. The species is endemic to South Africa.

== Etymology ==
The specific name, breyeri, is in honor of Dutch naturalist Hermann Gottfried Breyer.

== Geographic range ==
T. breyeri is found in the South African provinces of Free State, KwaZulu-Natal, and Mpumalanga.

== Habitat ==
The preferred natural habitat of T. breyeri is grassland, at altitudes of 1,400–2,000 m (4,600–6,600 ft).

== Description ==
T. breyeri is snake-like, with short vestigial legs. There are two toes on each front foot, and one toe on each back foot. Maximum snout-to-vent length (SVL) is 7.2 cm (2.8 in). The tail is very long, more than three times SVL.

== Reproduction ==
T. breyeri is oviparous. Clutch size is small, only one or two eggs laid in early summer.
