= 4-2-0 =

Locomotive wheel arrangement

4-2-0 (Jervis)
- Front of locomotive at left

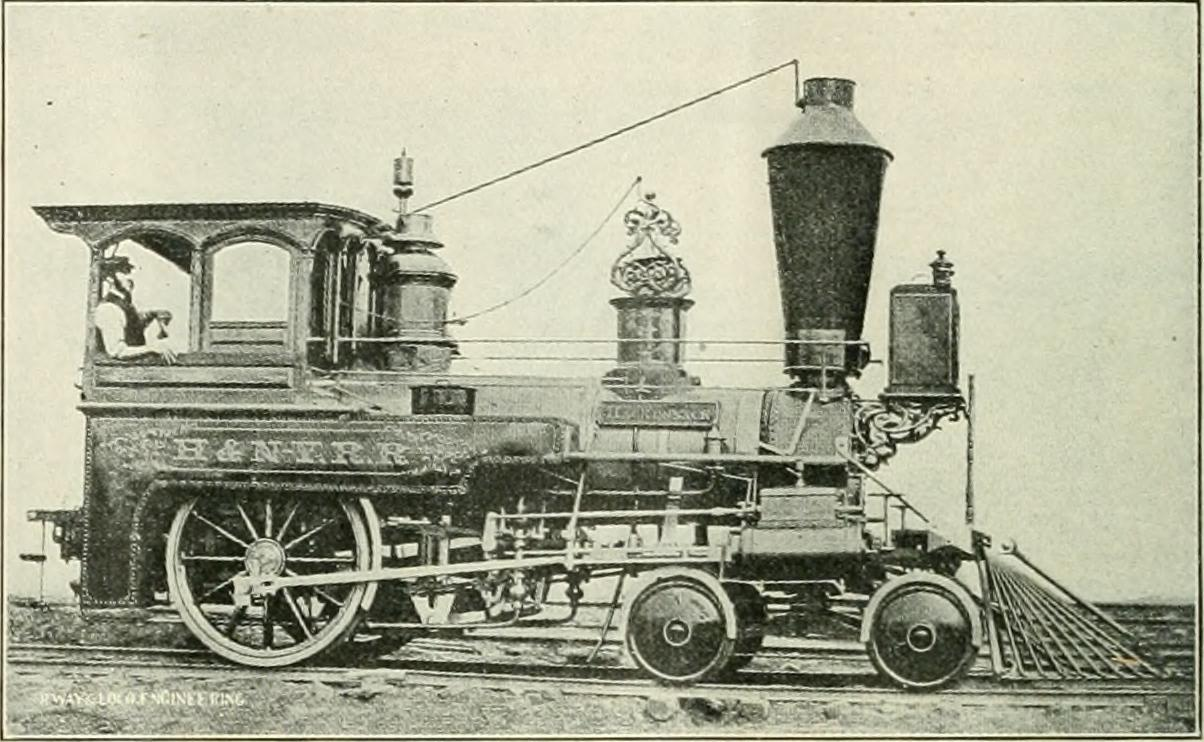
- Hackensack and New York Railroad 4-2-0
Equivalent classifications
- UIC class: 2A, 2'A
- French class: 210
- Turkish class: 13
- Swiss class: 1/3
- Russian class: 2-1-0
First known tender engine version
- First use: 1832
- Country: United States
- Locomotive: Experiment, renamed Brother Jonathan
- Railway: Mohawk and Hudson Railroad
- Designer: John B. Jervis
- Builder: West Point Foundry
- Evolved from: 0-4-0 (US) & 2-2-2 (UK)
- Evolved to: 4-4-0
- Benefits: Improved stability
- Drawbacks: Reduced adhesive weight

Under the Whyte notation for the classification of steam locomotives, 4-2-0 represents the wheel arrangement of four leading wheels on two axles, two powered driving wheels on one axle and no trailing wheels. This type of locomotive is often called a Jervis type, the name of the original designer.

== Overview ==
The 4-2-0 wheel arrangement type was common on United States railroads from the 1830s through the 1850s. The first 4-2-0 to be built was the Experiment, later named Brother Jonathan, for the Mohawk and Hudson Railroad in 1832. It was built by the West Point Foundry based on a design by John B. Jervis. Having little else to reference, the manufacturers patterned the boiler and valve gear after locomotives built by Robert Stephenson of England. A few examples of Stephenson locomotives were already in operation in America, so engineers did not have to travel too far to get their initial ideas.

In England, the 4-2-0 was developed around 1840 from the 2-2-2 design of Stephenson's first Long Boiler locomotive, which he had altered to place two pairs of wheels at the front to improve stability, with the outside cylinders between them.

In the United States, the design was a modification of the 0-4-0 design, then in common use. The 0-4-0 proved to be too rigid for the railroads of the day, often derailing on the tight curves and rapid elevation changes of early American railroads. For the 4-2-0, Jervis introduced a four-wheel leading truck under the locomotive's smokebox. It swiveled independently from the main frame of the locomotive, in contrast to the English 4-2-0 engines which had rigid frames. The pistons powered a single driving axle at the rear of the locomotive, just behind the firebox. This design resulted in a much more stable locomotive which was able to guide itself into curves more easily than the 0-4-0.

This design proved so effective on American railroads that many of the early 0-4-0s were rebuilt as 4-2-0s. The 4-2-0 excelled in its ability to stay on the track, especially those with the single driving axles behind the firebox, whose main virtue was stability. However, with only one driving axle behind the firebox, the locomotive's weight was spread over a small proportion of powered wheels, which substantially reduced its adhesive weight. On 4-2-0 locomotives which had the driving axle in front of the firebox, adhesive weight was increased. While this plan placed more of the locomotive's weight on the driving axle, it reduced the weight on the leading truck which made it more prone to derailments.

One possible solution was patented in 1834 by E.L. Miller and used extensively by Matthias W. Baldwin. It worked by raising a pair of levers to attach the tender frame to an extension of the engine frame, which transferred some weight from the tender to the locomotive frame and increased the adhesive weight. An automatic version was patented in 1835 by George E. Sellers and was used extensively by locomotive builder William Norris after he obtained rights to it. This system used a beam whose fulcrum was the driving axle. On flat and level surfaces, the beam would be slightly raised, but upon starting or on grades, the resistance made the beam assume a horizontal position which caused the locomotive to tip upward.

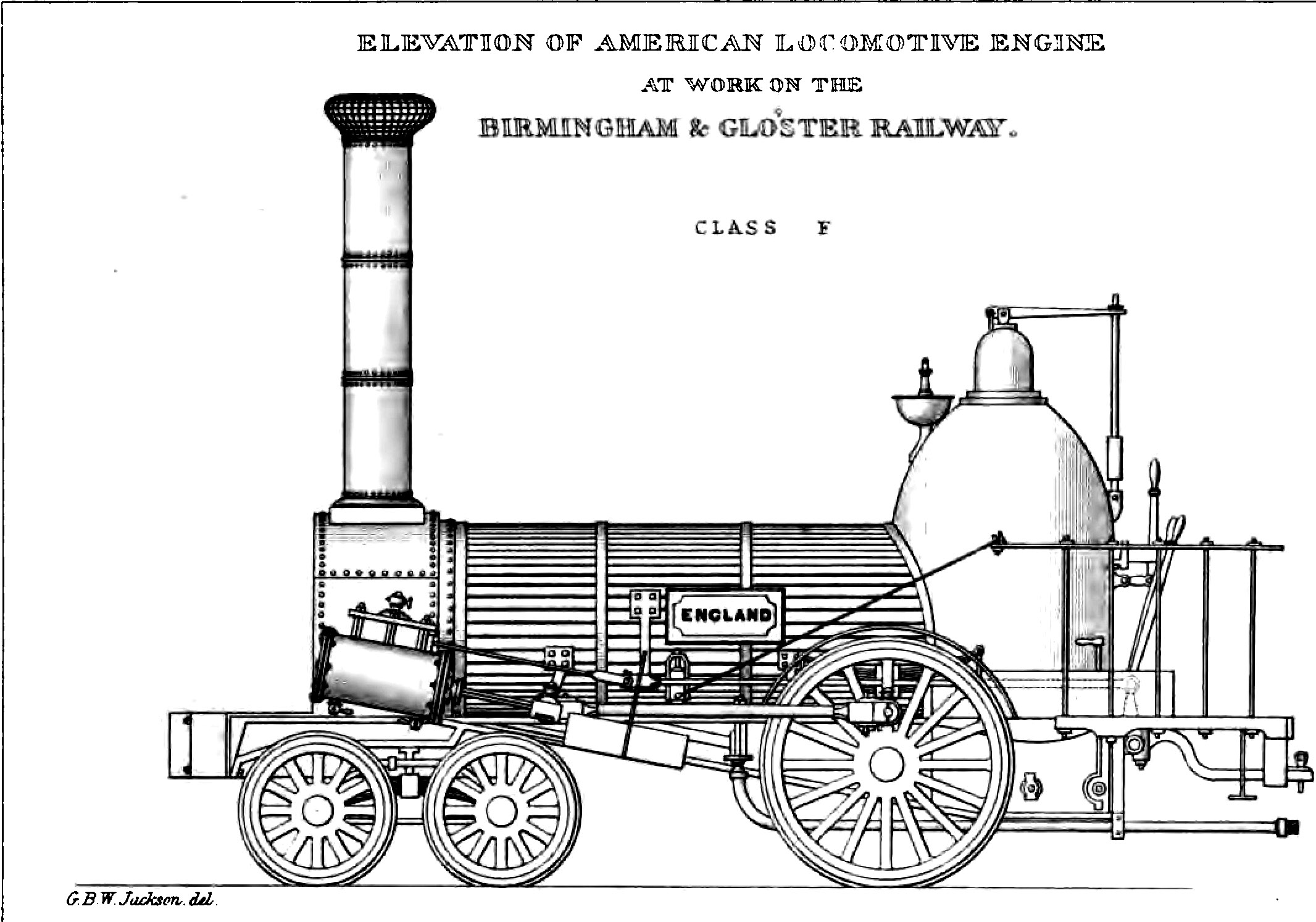
Norris engine for the Birmingham and Bristol Railway

A more practical solution, first put into production by Norris, relocated the driving axle to a location on the frame in front of the locomotive's firebox. This was done because Baldwin refused to grant rights to Norris to use his patented "half-crank" arrangement. Cantilevering the weight of the firebox and the locomotive crew behind the driving axle placed more weight on the driving axle without substantially reducing the weight on the leading truck. However Norris's design led to a shorter wheelbase, which tended to offset any gains in tractive force on the driving axle by reducing the locomotive's overall stability. A number of Norris locomotives were imported into England for use on the Birmingham and Bristol Railway since, because of the challenges presented by the Lickey Incline, British manufacturers declined to supply.

Once steel became available, greater rotational speeds became possible with multiple smaller coupled wheels. Five years after new locomotive construction began with the 0-4-0 Best Friend of Charleston of 1831, at the US West Point Foundry, the first 4-4-0 locomotive was designed by Henry R. Campbell, at the time the chief engineer for the Philadelphia, Germantown and Norristown Railway. Campbell received a patent for the design in February 1836 and soon set to work building the first 4-4-0. Campbell's 4-4-0 was a giant among locomotives for the time. Its cylinders were 14 in × 16 in (356 mm × 406 mm), had 54 in (1,372 mm) diameter driving wheels, a 90 psi (620 kPa) boiler and weighed 12 short tons (10.9 t). Campbell's locomotive was estimated to be able to pull a train of 450 short tons (410 t) at 15 mph (24 km/h) on level track, outperforming the strongest of Baldwin's 4-2-0s in tractive effort by about 63%. However, the frame and driving gear of his locomotive proved to be too rigid for the railroads of the time, which caused Campbell's prototype to be derailment-prone.

As the 1840s approached and more American railroads began to experiment with the new 4-4-0 locomotive type, the 4-2-0 fell out of favor since it was not as capable when pulling a load. 4-2-0s continued to be built into the 1850s, but their use was restricted to light-duty trains since, by this time, most railroads had found them unsuitable for regular work.

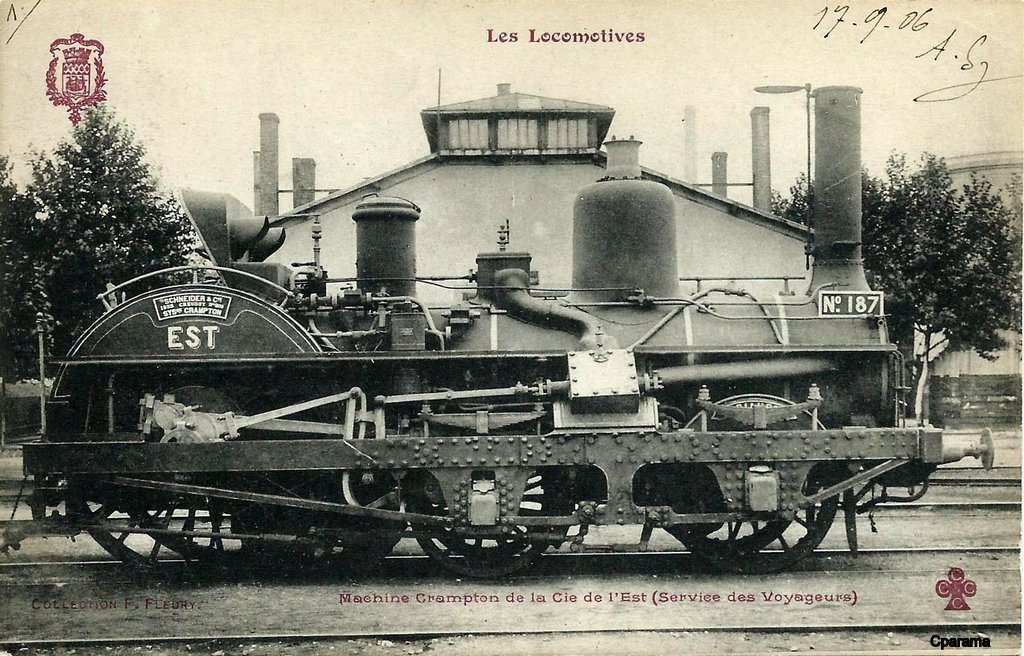
Crampton 4-2-0 built for the Chemin de fer de l’Est

In England four-coupled and six-coupled engines performed well with freight work. However, the aim for passenger work was greater speed. Because of the fragile cast iron connecting rods, "singles" continued to be used, with the largest driving wheels possible.

For unclear reasons, British manufacturers did not take up the idea of mounting the forward wheels on a bogie for some years. There were possibly fears about their stability and with a long rigid frame, greater speed was achieved, albeit at the cost of a very rough ride and damage to the track. The culmination of this approach was seen in the Crampton locomotive where, to make the driving wheels as large as possible, they were mounted behind the firebox.

== Usage ==
=== South Africa ===
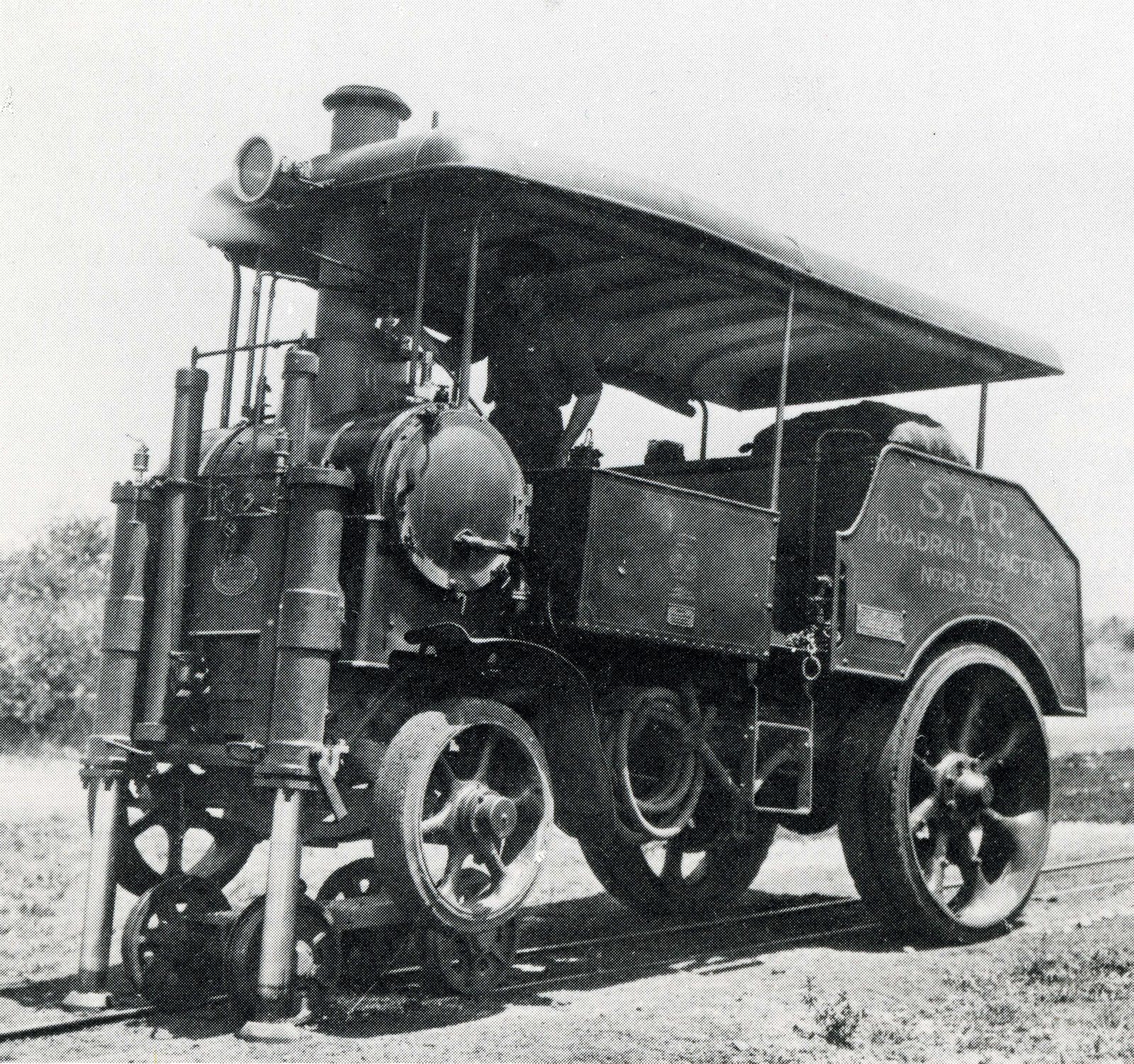
Dutton road-rail tractor, a modified Yorkshire steam tractor, c. 1924

In 1923, the South African Railways conducted trials with a prototype petrol-paraffin powered road-rail tractor and, in 1924, placed at least two Dutton steam road-rail tractors in service on the new 2 ft (610 mm) narrow gauge line between Naboomspruit and Singlewood in Transvaal. The petrol-paraffin prototype and one of the latter had a 4-2-0 wheel arrangement.

The prototype was a modified Dennis tractor which was fitted with a removable bogie between the front wheels to lift them high enough to prevent ground contact. A ball pin on the bogie fit into a socket in the front axle, and the bogie could easily be removed or replaced by running the tractor up a pair of ramps, placed on both sides of the track.

The production model was a modified Yorkshire steam tractor, fitted with jacks at the front to allow a separate bogie to be manoeuvred into position underneath the front axle to guide it on the rails. Without the bogie, the vehicle could still be driven on ordinary roads and had the advantage of being able to be detached and run around the train, without requiring special loops for that purpose. For reversing on the track, as when shunting, the rear wheels were modified to be steerable.

=== United States ===
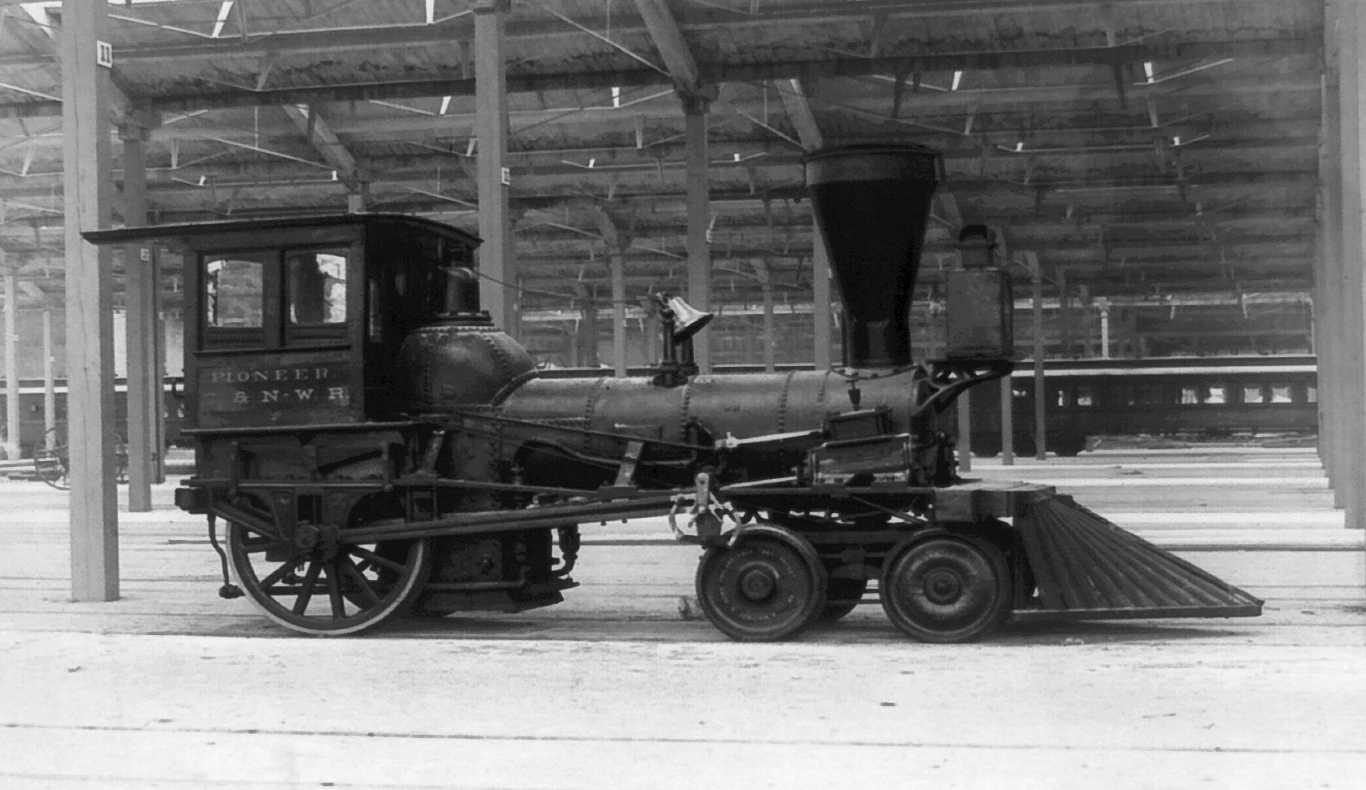
The Chicago and North Western Railway's first locomotive, Pioneer

The first railroad locomotive to operate in Chicago, Illinois was a 4-2-0, the Pioneer, which was built in 1837 by Baldwin Locomotive Works for the Utica and Schenectady Railroad in New York. It was later purchased used by William B. Ogden for the Galena and Chicago Union Railroad, the oldest predecessor of the Chicago and North Western Railway. The locomotive arrived in Chicago by schooner on 10 October 1848 and it pulled the first westbound train out of the city fifteen days later, on 25 October 1848.
