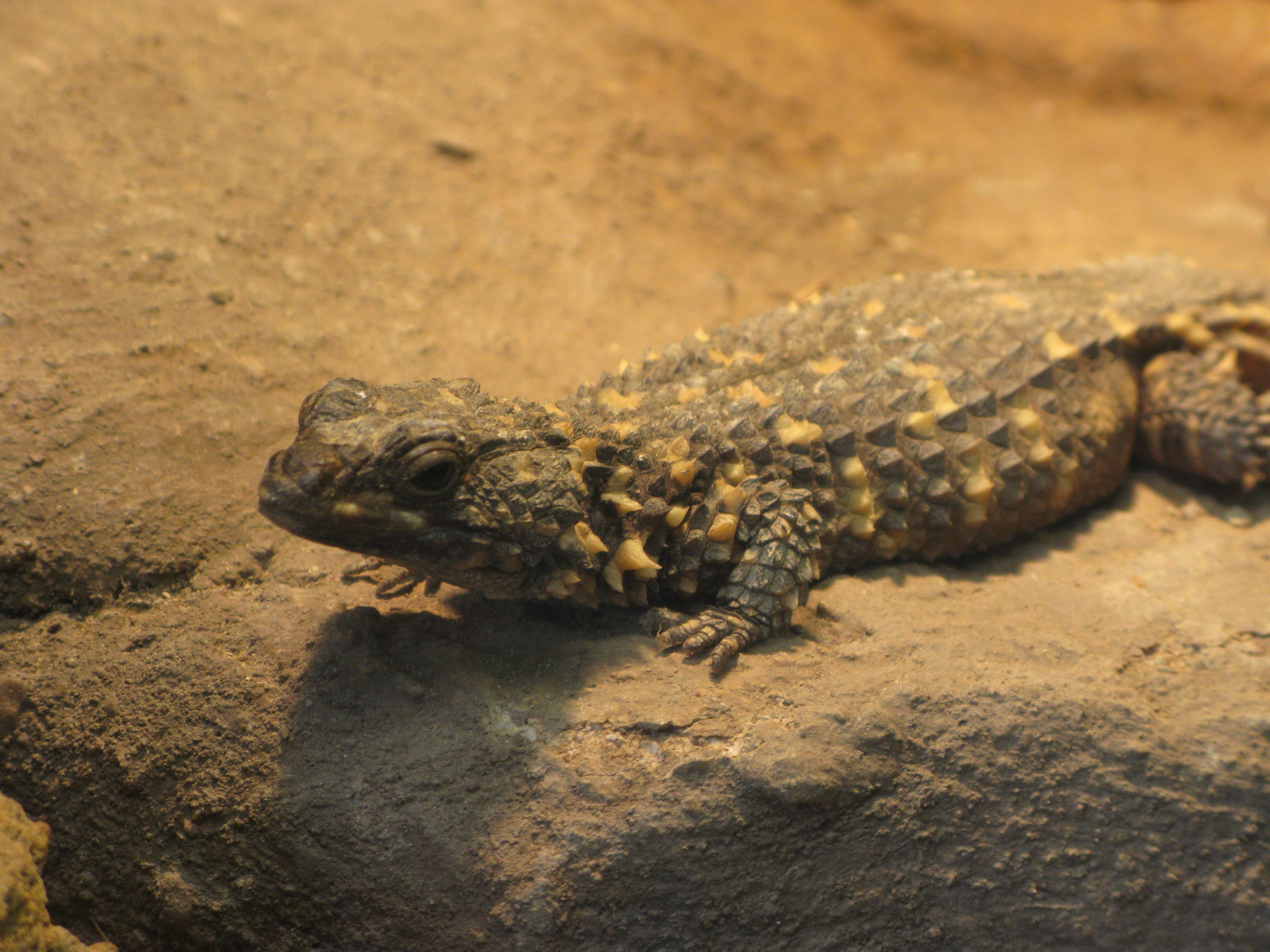

Conservation status
- Least Concern (IUCN 3.1)

Scientific classification
- Kingdom: Animalia
- Phylum: Chordata
- Class: Reptilia
- Order: Squamata
- Family: Cordylidae
- Genus: Smaug
- Species: S. depressus

Binomial name
- Smaug depressus (FitzSimons, 1930)

Synonyms
- Zonurus barbertonensis depressus Fitzsimons, 1930; Zonurus laevigatus Fitzsimons, 1933; Cordylus laevigatus Fitzsimons, 1943; Cordylus warreni depressus Fitzsimons, 1943; Cordylus depressus; Cordylus warreni laevigatus Loveridge, 1944; Smaug warreni depressus Stanley et al, 2011

= Zoutpansberg girdled lizard =

Species of lizard

Zoutpansberg girdled lizard (Smaug depressus) is a species of the genus Smaug. This species is only found on and around the Soutpansberg in South Africa and was before considered a subspecies of Warren's girdled lizard. Zoutpansberg girdled lizard's grow to a length up to 16 centimeters.

== Reproduction ==
To prevent females of getting away at the first approach, the male approaches the female during mating season very cautiously. He nods his head constantly to make its peaceful intentions cognizable. After mating it takes six months before two to five young are born.
