= South African gas-electric locomotive =

Experimental gas-electric locomotive

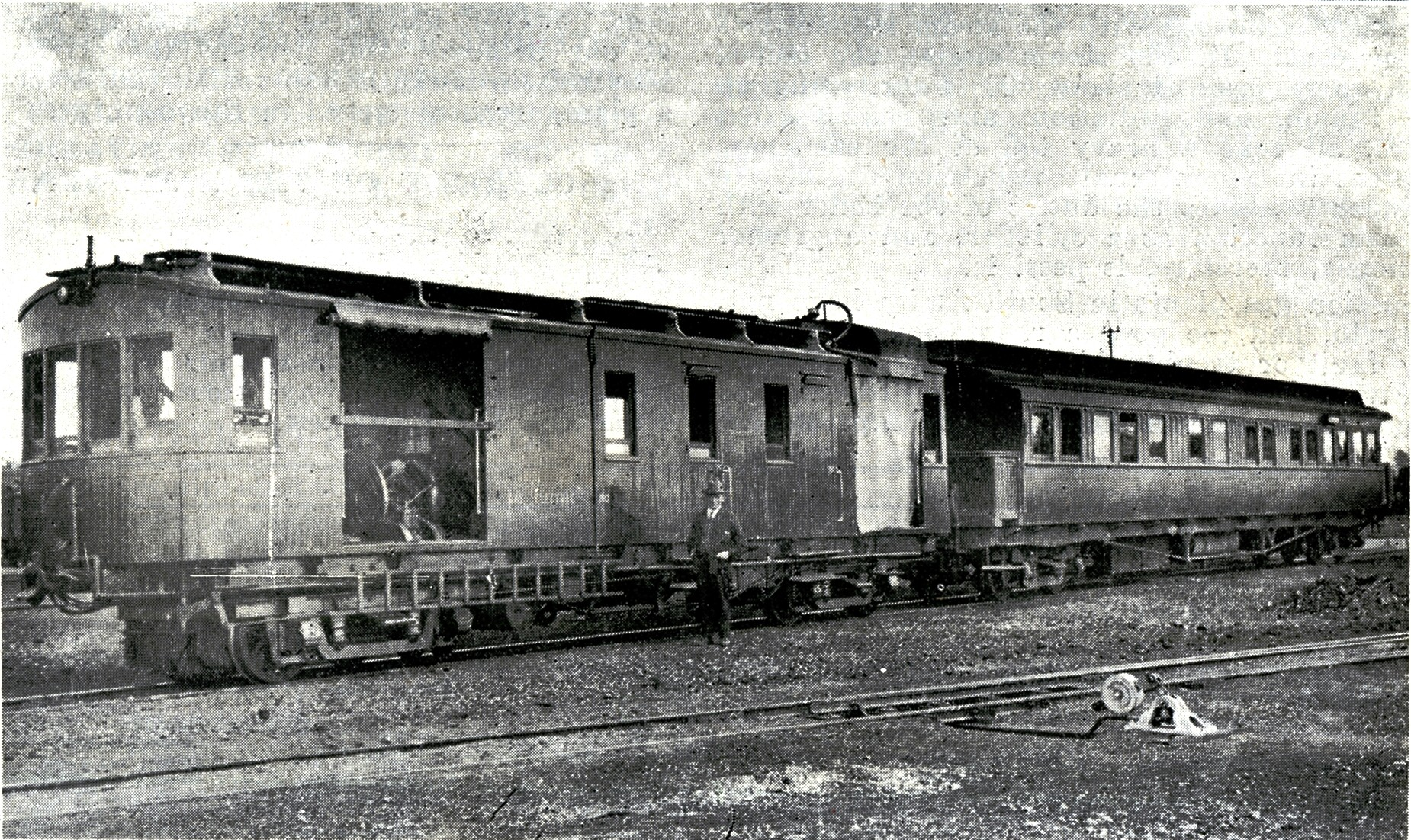
- Experimental gas-electric locomotive, c. 1923
Type and origin
- Power type: Gas-electric
- Designer: South African Railways (C. Lawson)
- Builder: South African Railways
- Model: GE1
- Build date: 1923
- Total produced: 1
Specifications
- Configuration
  - AAR: 1A-A1
  - UIC: (1A)(A1)
  - Commonwealth: 1A-A1
- Gauge: 3 ft 6 in (1,067 mm) Cape gauge
- Minimum curve: 3%
- Length
  - Over beams: 40 ft (12.2 m)
- Axle load: 7 long tons (7.1 t; 7.8 short tons) average
- Loco weight: 28 long tons (28.4 t; 31.4 short tons)
- Fuel type: Smokebox char
- Prime mover: Holt (Caterpillar tractor)
- RPM range: 750-800
  - RPM low idle: 750
  - Maximum RPM: 800
- Engine type: Petrol
- Traction motors: Two Siemens 50 hp (37 kW)
- Couplers: Johnston link-and-pin
Performance figures
- Maximum speed: 25 mph (40 km/h)
- Power output: 85 hp (63 kW)
Career
- Operators: South African Railways
- Number in class: 1
- Numbers: GE1
- First run: 1923

The South African Railways gas-electric locomotive of 1923 was an experimental gas-electric locomotive. The fuel, suction gas, was generated on-board the locomotive from coal.

In 1923, the South African Railways experimented with gas-electric motive power and constructed a single experimental producer gas-electric locomotive. The locomotive remained in service for several years and was followed by another, built by the General Electric Company, which was not successful and never entered line service after undergoing experimental trials. The gas-electric concept was eventually superseded by diesel-electric traction.

== Branch line non-profitability ==
The non-profitability of many branch line operations had been a problem for the South African Railways (SAR) from the outset. The question of non-paying branch lines was raised by Sir William Hoy, South African Railways and Harbours General Manager, in a paper read at the Imperial Motor Transport Conference in London in 1913. He drew attention to the fact that, in isolated districts with vast agricultural and mineral capabilities in many parts of the Union of South Africa, development was hampered by the lack of means of transportation.

In an attempt to reduce the cost of using steam locomotives on infrequently used and non-profitable branch lines, other forms of motive power were considered in the early 1920s. Diesel and diesel-electric locomotives were still in their infancy and were therefore not yet an attractive proposition, while the cost of electrification of such branch lines would be prohibitive. The first alternative form of traction to enter service was the Dutton road-rail tractor system in 1923.

During October 1922, Hoy encouraged further experiments to determine the practicability of the use of suction gas (also known as producer gas) as fuel for an alternative form of motive power, suitable for use on branch lines. Mr. C. Lawson, Superintendent Mechanical of the SAR, was tasked with the experiment.

== Suction gas principle ==
Combustion gases, rich in carbon monoxide and known variously as water gas, producer gas and mond gas, are generated by passing air and steam through some kind of red-hot burning carbonaceous fuel, usually coal. The gas generator consists of a combustion portion, where the fuel is initially burned to generate the required steam. The steam is then blown through this same burning fuel, taking air with it, and the producer gas is then liberated as a by-product of this combustion. Ordinarily, burning produces carbon dioxide, but by forcing steam through the burn a certain amount of incomplete combustion is caused which produces carbon monoxide.

Depending on the vessel used, the gas created may be under a slight pressure caused by the velocity of the steam and an expansion chamber is used to reduce this pressure. Experimenting established that the suction created by a petrol engine running on the gas actually increased the generation of the producer gas by drawing more steam and air through the burn. This could possibly make the expansion chamber superfluous. Producer gas generated by this method became known as suction gas. With a suction gas engine, the amount of gas produced is therefore partially dependent on the speed and throttle setting of the engine using it.

== Development ==
Lawson's experimental locomotive was based on the same principle as contemporary Swedish diesel-electric locomotives, except that the diesel engine prime mover would be replaced by a petrol engine running on carbon monoxide producer gas. As with a diesel-electric locomotive, an electric generator and traction motor combination would be used to transfer the engine's power to the wheels.

The locomotive was constructed on an old 40 feet (12.2 metres) bogie truck underframe. The producer gas generator was constructed from the smokebox section of a scrapped 6th Class locomotive's boiler. Smokebox char was used as fuel and the gas was passed from the gas generator through suitable wet scrubbers to remove tar to two Tilling-Stevens petrol engines. The engines came from Whippet tanks and were obtained from the Defence Department. A gas expansion chamber was constructed from an old chimney. The two engines drove shunt wound dynamos, obtained from General Electric, to power the traction motors which were two tramway motors obtained from De Beers in Kimberley. Since the gas was generated by the suction from the two internal combustion engines, the vehicle became known as a suction gas locomotive.

The locomotive ran in three forms. During the experimental stage, it was run from Germiston to Johannesburg station as a flat truck with all the components assembled on top and occupying about half of the deck space, but uncovered, to be viewed by the members of the Railway Board.

During the testing stage, an enclosed body was added. During a 167-mile-long (269-kilometre) test run to Volksrust, various adjustments were made to the water circulating arrangements. This improved the power output to the extent that the tram traction motors were unable to stand the continuous current which was generated, and they were replaced by two 50 horsepower (37 kilowatts) Siemens traction motors supplied by General Electric. These, in turn, required more current than the Whippet engines could generate and they were replaced by a 120 horsepower (89 kilowatts) Holt engine from a Caterpillar tractor, supplied by Messrs Fraser and Chalmers of Bulawayo in Southern Rhodesia.

The gas generator was never altered in principle from the first experiment and the expansion chamber was kept as it was, but the original wet scrubber was replaced with a dry scrubber early during development. Control of electrical current was by two tramway series-parallel controllers and resistors to ensure a range of speeds. The current generated with the engine at its normal working of 750 revolutions per minute was 140 amperes and 500 volts. 600 volts could be obtained by speeding up the engine, but this could place a too heavy load on the generator.

== Service ==
In its final guise, a small third-class compartment for twenty passengers was added on the unused deck space at the rear. The 28 long tons (28.4 metric tons; 31.4 short tons) locomotive, numbered GE1, was capable of negotiating a 3% curve at 6 miles per hour (10 kilometres per hour) and could attain a top speed of 25 miles per hour (40 kilometres per hour) on level track.

The Gas-electric locomotive was finally placed in service on the Winter's Rush branch line from Kimberley, where it often hauled a passenger coach. It remained in service on that line for several years.

== Termination ==
In June 1923, Colonel F.R. Collins DSO, the SAR Chief Mechanical Engineer, approved plans for a 200 horsepower (150 kilowatts) suction gas locomotive, but it never materialised. In 1925, a new 280 horsepower (210 kilowatts) suction gas locomotive was purchased instead. It was designed to SAR specifications by Mr. Harry Ricardo of Ricardo Brothers of Shoreham and built by the General Electric Company in England. At the time, it was claimed to be the largest of its type in the world, but it never emerged from the trial stages. It was found that the variable demand on the gas generator precluded a regular supply of gas of the required quality. The gas-electric locomotive was eventually superseded by the diesel-electric locomotive, which proved to be a far more convenient and much less cumbersome machine to operate over long distances.

No more suction gas locomotives were acquired. The experimental gas-electric locomotive's frame, bogies and traction motors were used c. 1935 to construct a unique electric motor coach, numbered 9181 and classified as U-34-M. It was placed in service hauling a trailer coach between Mason's Mill and Pietermaritzburg, where it was known as the Mason’s Mill Shuttle. Since the earlier Cape motor-coaches still worked under 1,500 V DC at the time, EMU no. 9181 was the first SAR motor-coach to operate under 3 kV DC catenary.

== Illustration ==
The main picture shows engine no. GE1 in service on the Winter's Rush branch line, while the following photographs all show it during development and testing, c. 1923.

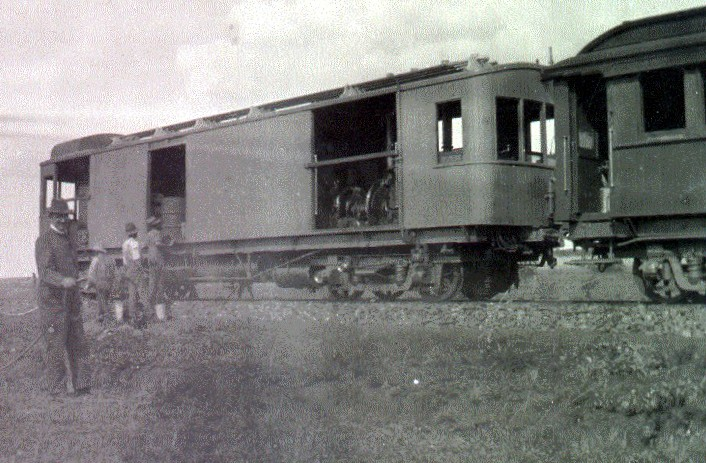
No. GE1, right side

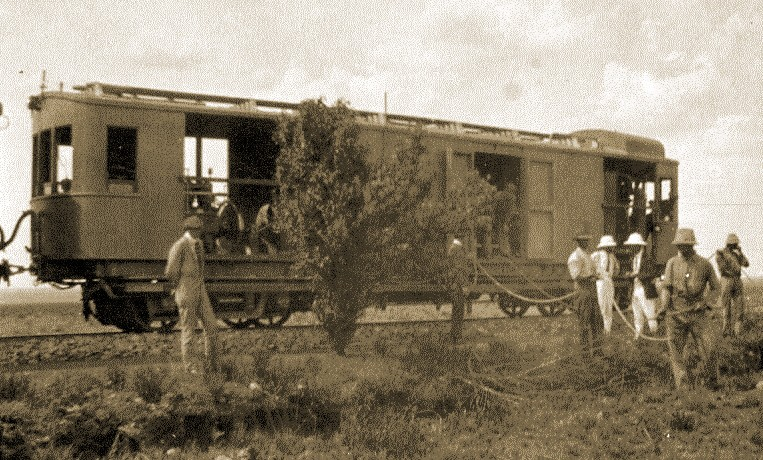
No. GE1, left side

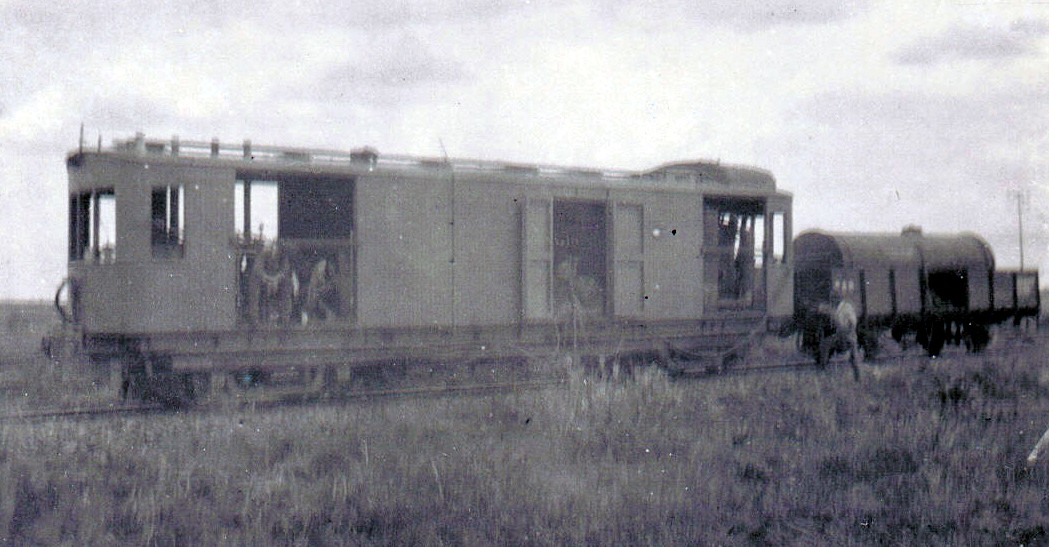
No. GE1, left side
