= Smaug swazicus =

Scientific classification
- Kingdom: Animalia
- Phylum: Chordata
- Class: Reptilia
- Order: Squamata
- Family: Cordylidae
- Genus: Smaug
- Species: S. swazicus

Binomial name
- Smaug swazicus Stanley & Bates, 2020

Species of lizard

Smaug swazicus (also known as the Swazi dragon lizard) is a species of lizard in the family Cordylidae. It is a small lizard found in South Africa.
