= Cornelis Jacobus Swierstra =

Dutch-born South African entomologist (1873–1952)

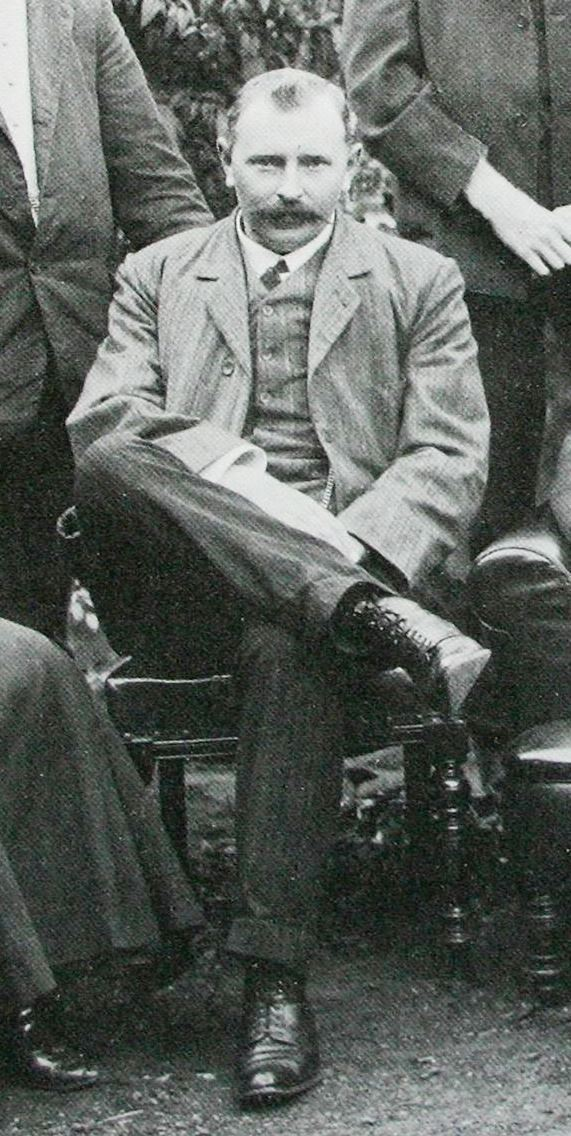
Swierstra at the Transvaal Museum in March 1909

Cornelis Jacobus Swierstra (22 October 1873, Amsterdam—11 March 1952, Pretoria) was a Dutch-born South African entomologist. Swierstra studied entomology at the University of Amsterdam. He moved to South Africa in 1894, and was employed at Transvaal Museum from 1896. By 1909 he was assistant-director, and in 1921 he followed Herman Gottfried Breijer as director of the museum. In 1936 he was elected first president of the South African Museums Association.

In 1900, Swierstra married Niesje Kwak, with whom he had two children, and in 1912 Anthonia Johanna Franken, with whom he had four children.
