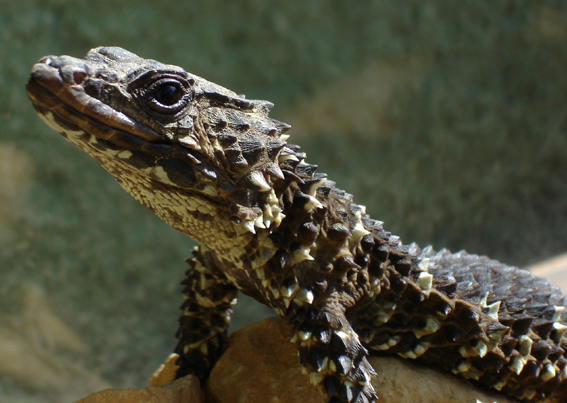

Conservation status
- Least Concern (IUCN 3.1)

Scientific classification
- Kingdom: Animalia
- Phylum: Chordata
- Class: Reptilia
- Order: Squamata
- Family: Cordylidae
- Genus: Smaug
- Species: S. breyeri

Binomial name
- Smaug breyeri (Van Dam, 1921)

Synonyms
- Zonurus breyeri Van Dam, 1921; Cordylus warreni breyeri — V. FitzSimons, 1943; Cordylus breyeri — Branch, 1998; Smaug breyeri — E. Stanley et al., 2011

= Smaug breyeri =

Species of lizard

Smaug breyeri, also known commonly as the Waterberg dragon lizard or the Waterberg girdled lizard, is a species of lizard in the family Cordylidae. The species is endemic to South Africa.

== Etymology ==
The specific name, breyeri, is in honor of Dutch naturalist Hermann Gottfried Breyer.

== Habitat ==
The preferred natural habitat of S. breyeri is rocky areas of savanna, at altitudes of 700–1,700 m (2,300–5,600 ft).

== Description ==
Adults of S. breyeri usually have a snout-to-vent length (SVL) of 11–12 cm (4.3–4.7 in), but may grow as large as 14.5 cm (5.7 in) SVL.

== Reproduction ==
S. breyeri is viviparous. Two to four young are born in summer. Compared to adults, the neonates are quite large, each measuring about 11 cm (4.3 in) in total length (including tail).
