= Birmingham and Bristol Railway =

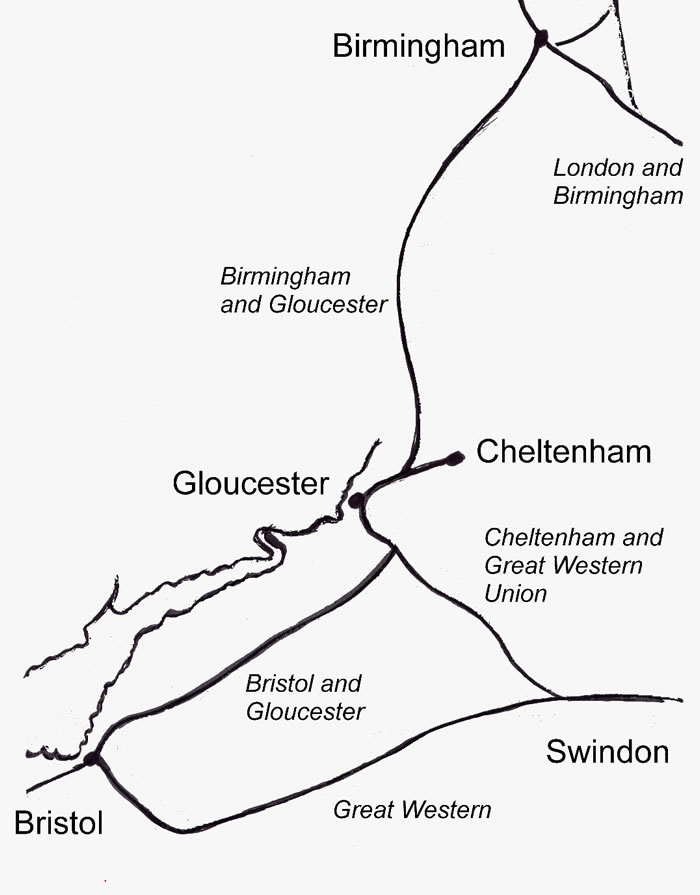
- Sketchmap of the Birmingham and Gloucester Railway and its relationship to other lines

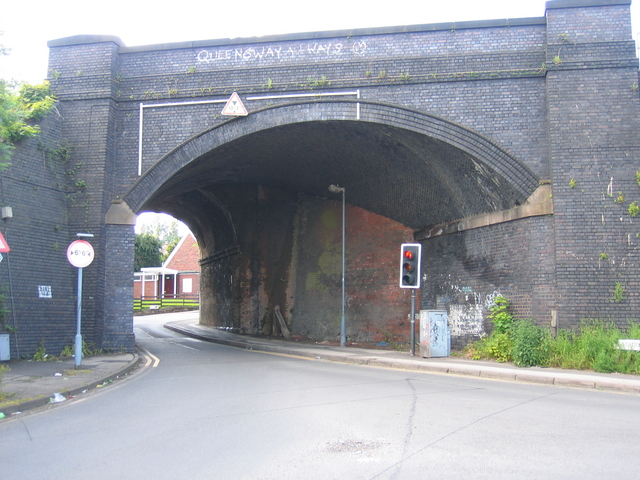
- Bridge under the old Birmingham and Bristol Railway

Overview
- Dates of operation: 1845–1846
- Predecessor: Birmingham and Gloucester Railway; Bristol and Gloucester Railway
- Successor: Midland Railway

Technical
- Track gauge: 4 ft 8 1/2 in (1,435 mm) standard gauge

The Birmingham and Bristol Railway was a short-lived railway company, formed in 1845 by the merger of the Birmingham and Gloucester Railway and the Bristol and Gloucester Railway. From 14 January 1845, the Birmingham and Gloucester and the Bristol and Gloucester Railways agreed to be operated jointly under the title of the ‘Birmingham and Bristol Railway’. The plan had been to get this amalgamation officially authorised through an act of Parliament and this proposal was submitted alongside a Midland Railway absorption bill. The amalgamation bill was soon dropped paving the way for both companies to be absorbed by the Midland Railway from 3 August 1846. Although the title was used, this was never an officially approved company.

== Origin ==
At Gloucester the latter had formed a junction with the 7 ft (2,134 mm) broad gauge Cheltenham and Great Western Union Railway running into the town on mixed gauge tracks. In 1843 the C&GWU had been taken over by the Great Western Railway which began putting pressure on the Bristol and Gloucester to join the GWR at Bristol, to subscribe to the proposed South Devon Railway, and to convert to broad gauge track, to the alarm of the Northern "narrow" gauge railways.

The "break-of-gauge" at Gloucester was a major problem. It caused pandemonium as whole trainloads of passengers, and their luggage, changed from one to another, together with the transshipment of goods.

== Formation ==
Parliament had established a commission to examine the problem and there was a consensus that the track should be unified throughout the line. The GWR made an offer to the Birmingham and Bristol directors. The latter's shareholders held out for more, and the GWR deferred its decision for three days. At this moment the Midland Railway made its move.

True or not, the story of how it came about is a part of railway legend, when the Midland's John Ellis was travelling, quite by chance it is said, in a train with two Bristol & Gloucester directors. He overheard them discussing the matter, and took it on himself to offer better terms.

The Bristol and Birmingham and Midland Railways Act 1846 (9 & 10 Vict. c. cccxxvi) allowed the lines to merge and become part of the Midland Railway. The bill was managed by Samuel Carter, who was solicitor to both Midland and LNWR.

The LNWR was also alarmed at the idea of the GWR's broad gauge reaching the Midlands and it offered to share any losses the Midland might incur. In the event, all that was needed was a nominal rent for the Midland's use of the LNWR's Birmingham New Street station.

There were, of course, still problems with gauge. In 1848 the Midland built its own line into Gloucester, avoiding the GWR ex-Cheltenham and Great Western Union line, and laid mixed gauge to Bristol. By 1857 the whole line had been converted to standard gauge.
