= Herman Gottfried Breijer =

Dutch-born South African naturalist and museologist (1864–1923)

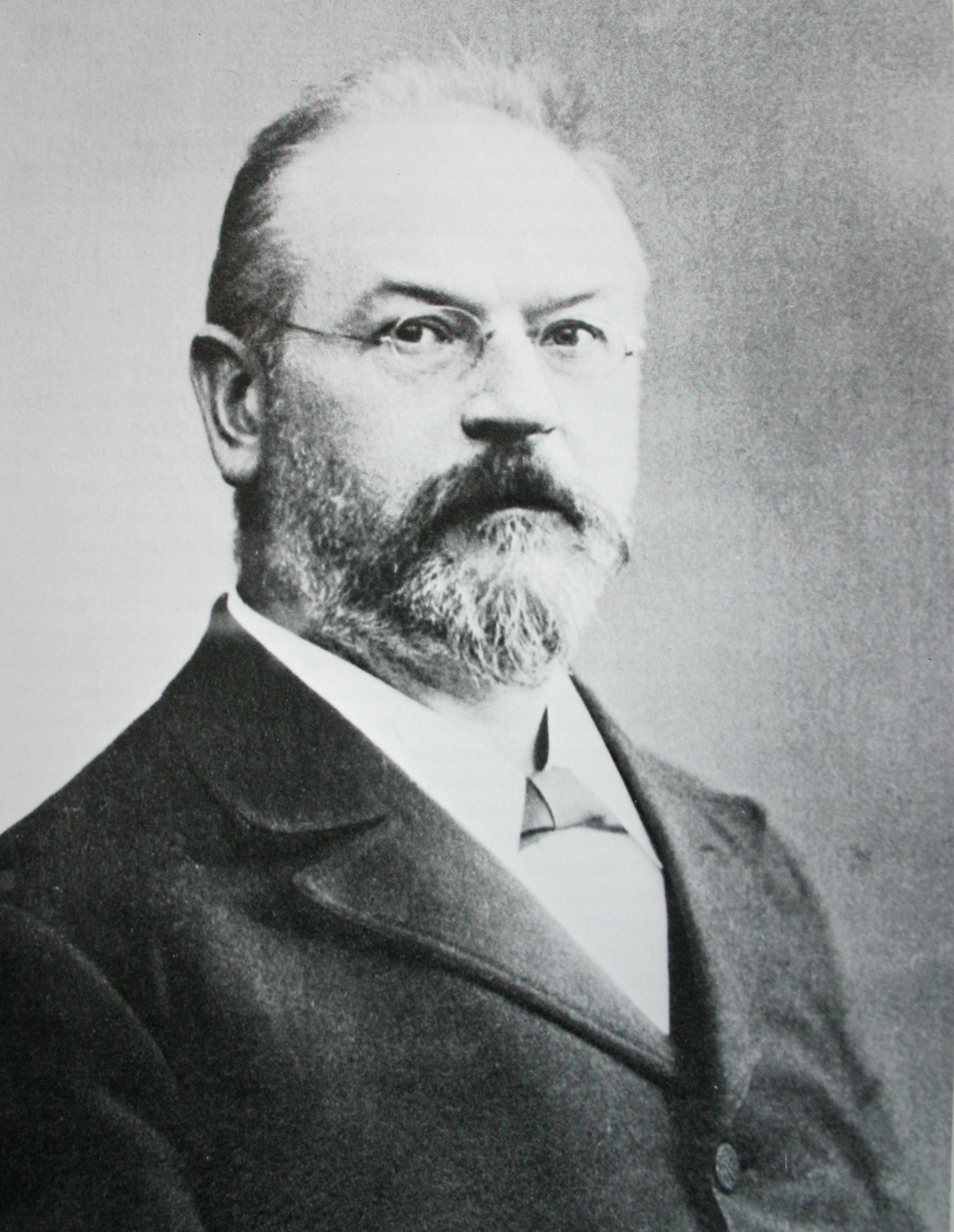
Herman Gottfried Breyer, c1910

Herman Gottfried Breijer or Breyer (12 July 1864, in Arnhem – 10 October 1923, in Morgenzon, Louis Trichardt dist.) was a Dutch-born South African naturalist and museologist, the son of Carl Arnold Breijer and his wife, Elize Wesser.

Breijer was educated at Amsterdam University being awarded a doctorate in mathematics and physics in 1893. The same year he was appointed as lecturer at the Staatsgymnasium in Pretoria. He supported the idea of establishing a Staatsmuseum (later the Transvaal Museum) and was a trustee on its first board in 1893. He also functioned as honorary curator until 1897 when a suitable director was found. Breijer taught natural science and mathematics at the Pretoria Normal College (later the University of Pretoria) and in 1905 was appointed to the chair of mathematics at the Johannesburg School of Mines and Technology, which later became the Witwatersrand University. He remained there until 1913 when he succeeded Dr. J. W. B. Gunning as director of the Transvaal Museum. Breijer was often associated with the Dutch-born entomologist Cornelis Jacobus Swierstra (1874-1952) in his collecting done in South Africa and Mozambique, and was succeeded as director by him in 1921.

Breijer is commemorated in the scientific names of several plants: Thesium breyeri, Pavetta breyeri, Blepharis breyeri, and former species in the genera Warburgia, Disa, Barleria, and Cleome. He is also commemorated in the scientific names of two species of African lizards: Smaug breyeri and Tetradactylus breyeri.

Breijer's son, J.W.F. Breijer, served with the SAP at Namutoni in South West Africa, and maintained a unique flora collection from that country.
