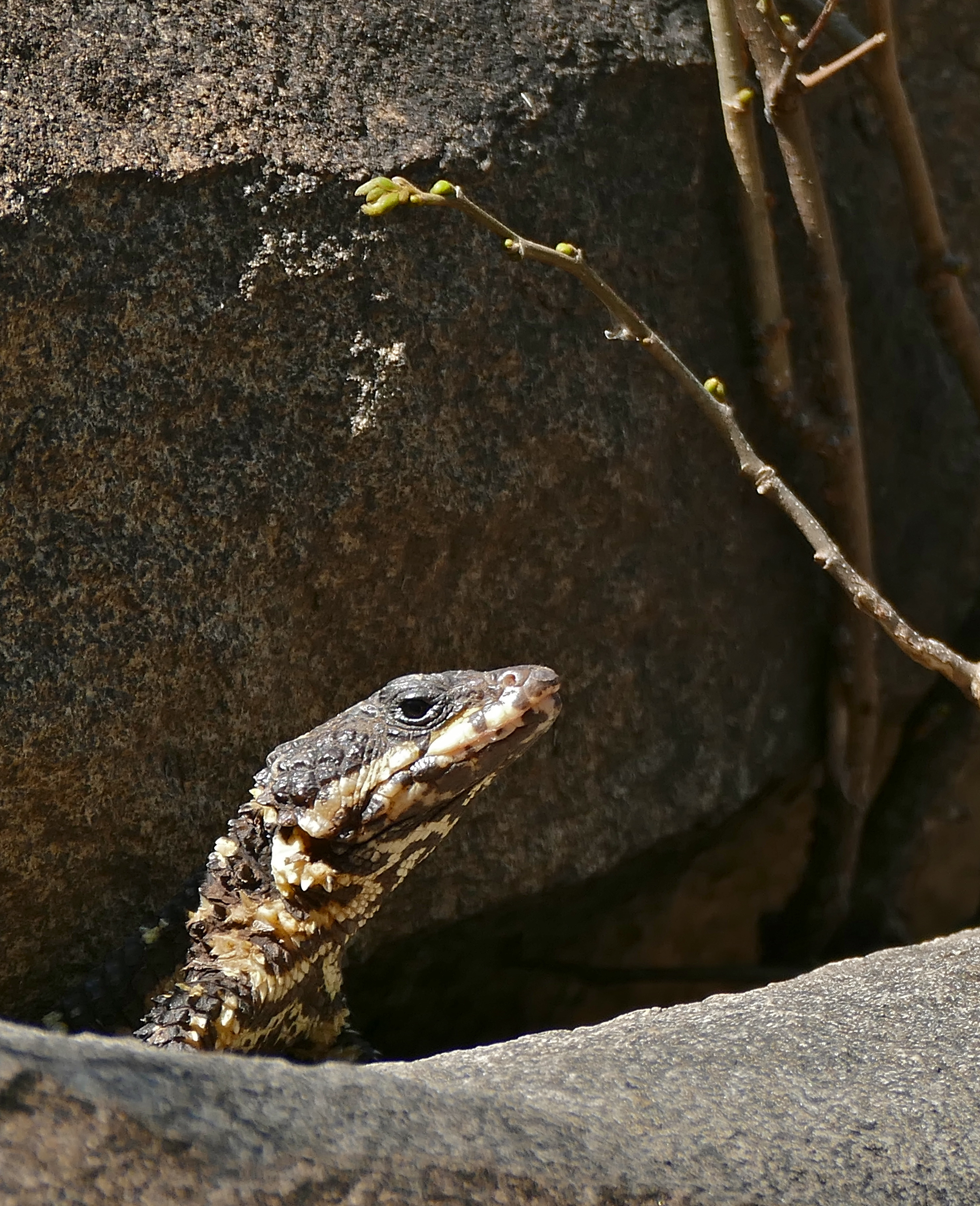

Conservation status
- Least Concern (IUCN 3.1)

Scientific classification
- Kingdom: Animalia
- Phylum: Chordata
- Class: Reptilia
- Order: Squamata
- Family: Cordylidae
- Genus: Smaug
- Species: S. barbertonensis

Binomial name
- Smaug barbertonensis (Van Dam, 1921)

= Smaug barbertonensis =

Species of lizard

Smaug barbertonensis (also known as the Barberton dragon lizard or Barberton girdled lizard) is a species of lizard in the family Cordylidae. It is a small lizard found in eastern South Africa and Eswatini.
