= Smaug regius =

Conservation status
- Least Concern (IUCN 3.1)

Scientific classification
- Kingdom: Animalia
- Phylum: Chordata
- Class: Reptilia
- Order: Squamata
- Family: Cordylidae
- Genus: Smaug
- Species: S. regius

Binomial name
- Smaug regius (Broadley, 1962)

Species of lizard

Smaug regius (also known as the regal girdled lizard) is a species of lizard in the family Cordylidae. It is a small lizard found in Zimbabwe.
