= South African Dutton road–rail tractors =

1923 narrow-gauge steam tractors

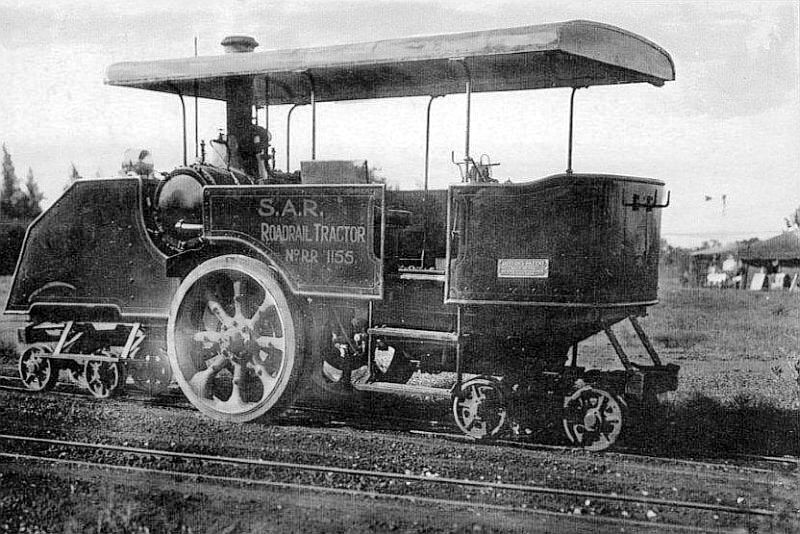
- Dutton rail-only tractor no. RR1155, c. 1924
Type and origin
- Power type: Internal combustion (prototype); Steam (production models)
- Designer: South African Railways (Maj Frank Dutton)
- Builder: Dennis (prototype); Yorkshire (production models)
- Build date: 1917–1924
- Total produced: 3
- Rebuilder: Britannia Engineering Works
- Rebuild date: 1923–1924
Specifications
- Configuration
  - Whyte: 4-2-0 (Jervis) – R1501 & RR973; 4-2-4 (Huntington) – RR1155
  - UIC: 2An2t – R1501 & RR973; 2A2n2t – RR1155
- Gauge: 2 ft (610 mm) narrow
- Axle load: 3,000 lb (1,361 kg) (prototype)
  - Leading: 3,000 lb (1,361 kg) (prototype)
  - Coupled: 5,655 lb (2,565 kg) (off-rail)
- Adhesive weight: 5,655 lb (2,565 kg) (prototype)
- Fuel type: Power paraffin (prototype); Coal (production models)
- Cylinders: Four (prototype); Two (production models)
- Couplers: Drawbar and pin
Performance figures
- Power output: 35 hp (26 kW) (prototype)
Career
- Operators: South African Railways
- Number in class: 3
- Numbers: R1501, RR973, RR1155
- First run: 1923–1924
- Last run: 1927

The South African Railways Dutton road–rail tractors of 1923 were road–rail steam tractors.

In 1917, the South African Railways conducted trials with a prototype petrol-paraffin powered Dutton road–rail tractor. In 1924, it placed two production model steam rail tractors in service on the new narrow gauge line between Naboomspruit and Singlewood in Transvaal. One was constructed as a 4-2-0 road–rail tractor while the other was constructed as a bi-directional 4-2-4 rail-only tractor.

== Branch line unprofitability ==
The unprofitability of many branch line operations had been a problem for the South African Railways (SAR) from the outset. The question of non-paying branch lines was raised by Sir William Hoy, South African Railways and Harbours General Manager, in a paper read before the Imperial Motor Transport Conference in London in 1913. He drew attention to the fact that, in isolated districts with vast agricultural and mineral capabilities in many parts of the Union of South Africa, development was hampered by the lack of transportation.

== Development ==
In an attempt to assist in solving the branch line problem, Major Frank Dutton, SAR Signal Engineer and the Motor Transport Superintendent, developed and took out several patents on a loco-tractor system. The aim was to replace or eliminate the steam locomotive on non-profitable branch lines since he considered the locomotive to be the main deciding factor on the questions of grades, curves and weight of rails, which governed the cost of construction.

Dutton argued that a rubber tyre in contact with a hard road would be better at transferring tractive power than a steel wheel on a steel rail. He claimed that the tractive effort to be obtained by using rubber-tyred driving wheels running on roads was 1,330 pounds (603 kilograms) per long ton of adhesive weight, compared to the 334 pounds (151 kilograms) per long ton which could be obtained by using steel wheels running on rails. His proposed system would use railway trucks on rails, hauled by a rail-and-road-borne tractor which would be guided by a four-wheeled bogie on the rails, but with driving wheels fitted with solid rubber tyres which would run on well-prepared strips of the road on each side of the rail tracks.

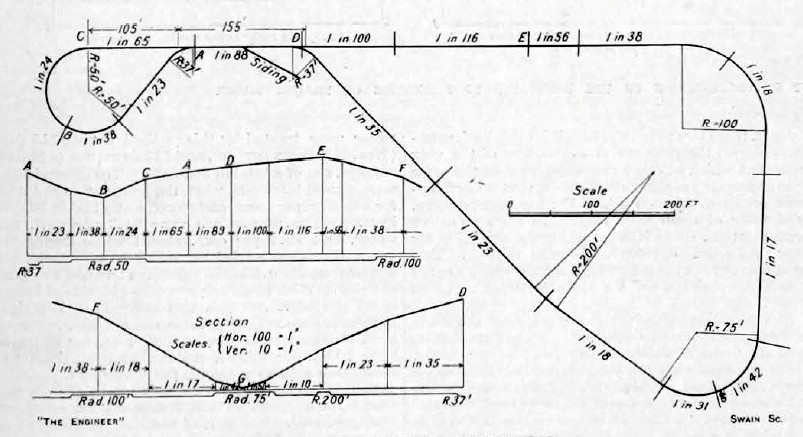
Canada Junction test track layout

In 1917, General Manager Hoy authorised a trial of the system and a test circuit was laid on the veld at Canada Junction, 9 miles (14 kilometres) from Johannesburg. The dog-bone test circuit was 742 yards (678 metres) around, laid with light 16 pounds per yard (8 kilograms per metre) rails on 7 pounds (3 kilograms) steel sleepers and hook bolts. The track included tight curves of as low as 37 feet (11 metres) in radius and steep gradients of as much as 1 in 17 (5.88%).

The prototype loco-tractor was a modified Dennis tractor, powered by a 35 horsepower (26 kilowatts) four-cylinder petrol-paraffin engine, which was fitted with a removable bogie between the front wheels to lift them high enough to prevent ground contact. A ball pin on the bogie fitted into a socket under the front axle and the bogie could easily be removed or replaced by running the tractor up a pair of ramps placed on both sides of the track. The tractor's weight distribution was 3,000 pounds (1,361 kilograms) on the rail and 5,655 pounds (2,565 kilograms) on the rubber-tyred driving wheels.

A drawing of the tractor in the patent document shows a number of refinements which were considered at the time but not actually fitted to the Dennis tractor prototype, such as a six-cylinder engine, steerable rear wheels for use when reversing on the rail and a power-operated screw-jacking system to raise the front road wheels to obviate the use of ramps.

== Singlewood Branch ==
The experiments proved successful and authority was granted in 1923 to construct a 2 ft (610 mm) narrow gauge branch line from Naboomspruit to Singlewood, built to Dutton's system, the low cost of construction being one of the motivating factors. The section to Crecy was completed on 15 April 1924 and the full 20 miles 47 chains (33.1 kilometres) line to Singlewood was opened on 22 September of that same year.

Two tractors were used on this narrow gauge road–rail line, both steam-powered and both rebuilt by the Britannia Engineering Works of Johannesburg from Yorkshire Patent Steam Wagon Company steam tractors.

- No. RR973 was rebuilt to a road–rail tractor with a 4-2-0 wheel arrangement similar to that of the prototype Dennis road–rail tractor, but fitted with jacks at the front to allow a separate bogie to be manoeuvred into position underneath the front axle without the need for ramps. Without the bogie, the vehicle could still be driven on ordinary roads and had the advantage of being able to be detached and run around the train without requiring special loops for that purpose.
- No. RR1155 underwent more drastic modification to turn it into a rail-only vehicle with a 4-2-4 wheel arrangement. It had a bogie at either end with the single pair of driving wheels on a differential axle in the centre and was arranged for forward and reverse movement at all speeds. It was bi-directional, but could only be used on the rails. Since, on occasion, the vehicle had to be transported by road, its construction was such that it could be readily disassembled into more easily transportable units to be moved on road wheels to a workshop or for transfer of any other kind.

== British Empire Exhibition ==
Major Dutton and General R.S. Stronach formed a company to promote the system. Under the name of Roadrails Limited, they exhibited and demonstrated the Stronach–Dutton system at the 1924–1925 British Empire Exhibition at Wembley Park in north-west London, where it was presented as a solution to the transport problems which were experienced in several British Colonies. Lines built to the system had been introduced in England, Scotland, Spain, Morocco, South Africa and Uganda, and demonstrated (at least) in Australia and India, possibly also in Canada, Colombia and Palestine. All of the known installations were initiated before the Wembley exhibition.

Several different tractors were demonstrated at Wembley, powered by either steam or petrol engines and mostly supplied by William Beardmore and Company, but not the Yorkshire type as used in South Africa. Although it was popular as a ride, it seems to have been a failure as a sales promotion and led to no known new installations. It did not reopen to the public for the 1925 season of the exhibition and Roadrails Limited closed down in 1927.

== Termination ==
In South Africa, the system was also short-lived. The tractive effort per ton of axle load which was assumed by Dutton for the loco-tractor was found to be unduly optimistic, while that for rail traction was unduly pessimistic. The system of combined road-and-rail turned out to have the limitations of both and advantages of neither.

The Singlewood branch line itself seemed to be successful. As traffic grew, more motive power was needed and the Yorkshire tractors were joined by Class NG6 Lawley no. NG98. By 1927, it was joined by Lawley no. NG103, but by this time the loco-tractor system was already terminated. By 17 October 1927, the Singlewood branch was regauged to 3 ft 6 in (1,067 mm) Cape gauge for regular steam locomotive working and by 11 June 1928 it was extended to Zebediela.

== Illustration ==
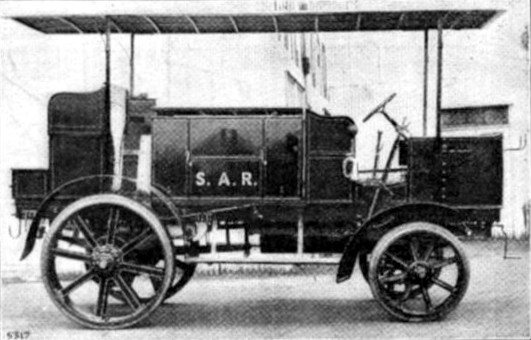
Power-paraffin fueled Dennis tractor, prior to modification to Dutton road–rail tractor no. R1501

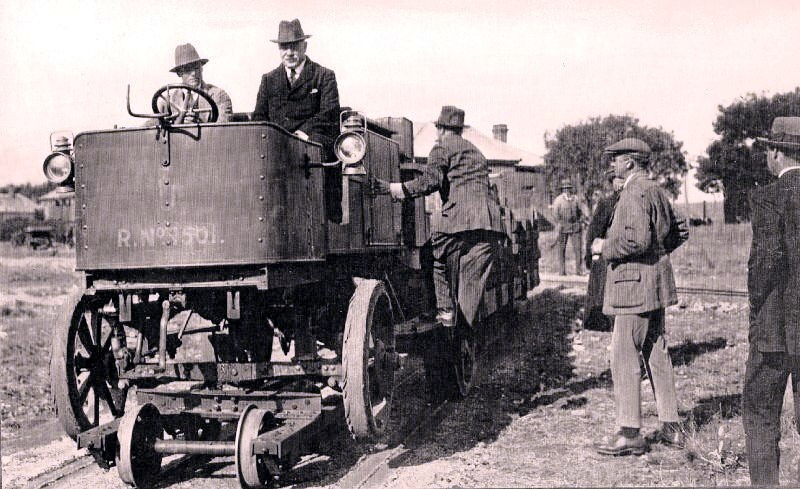
Prototype no. R1501 being demonstrated to Sir William Hoy, seated next to the driver, at Canada Junction, August 1920

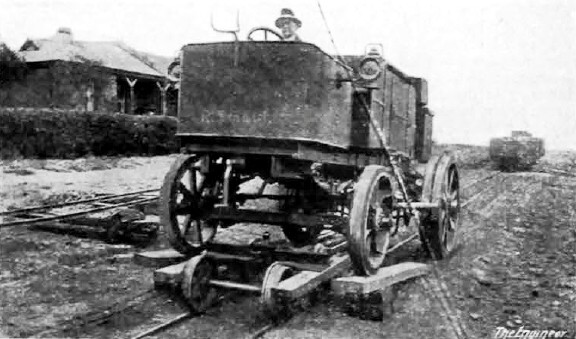
Prototype no. R1501 demonstrating shedding its bogie, Canada Junction, August 1920

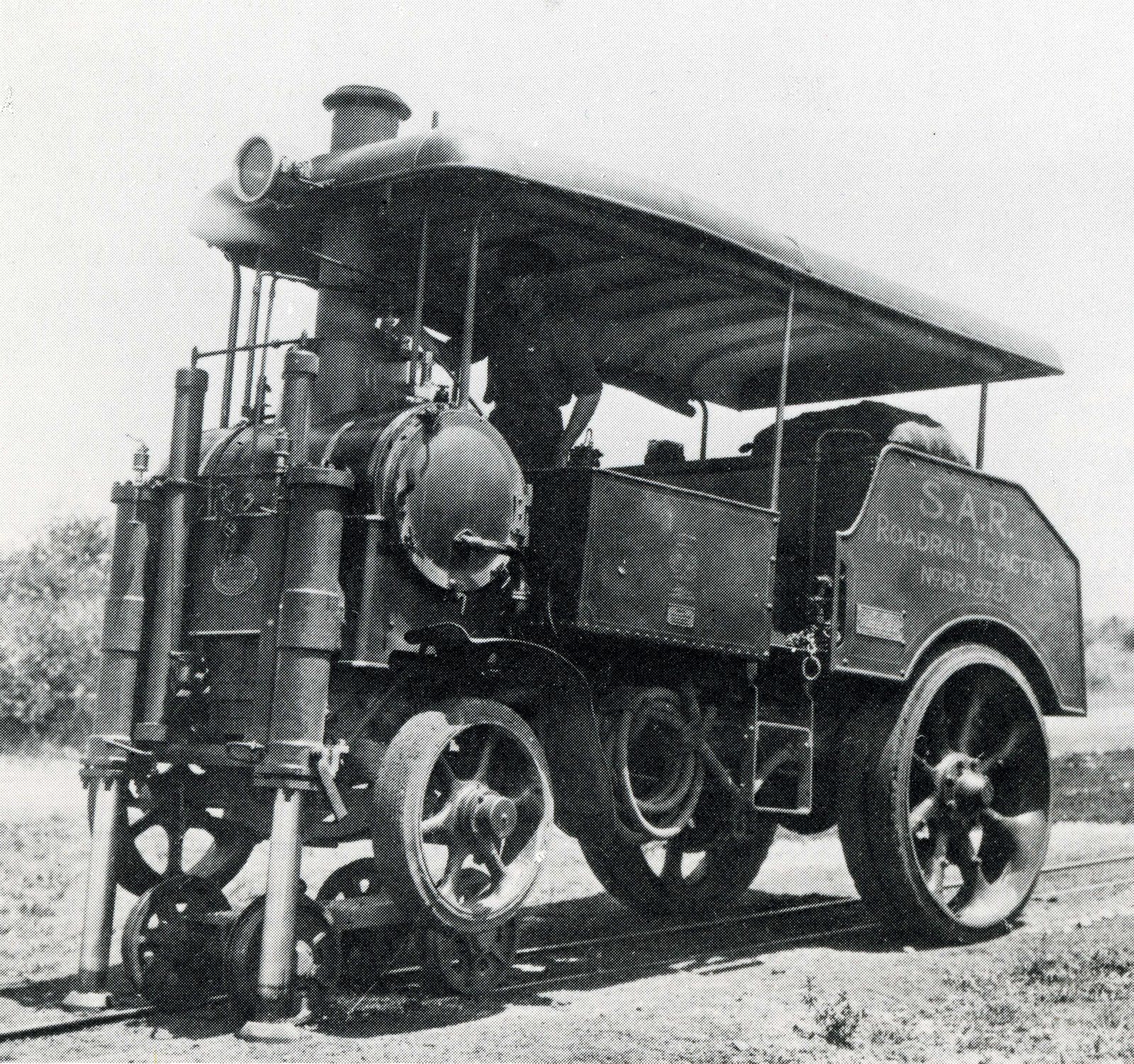
Road–rail tractor no. RR973, rebuilt from a Yorkshire steam tractor, c. 1924

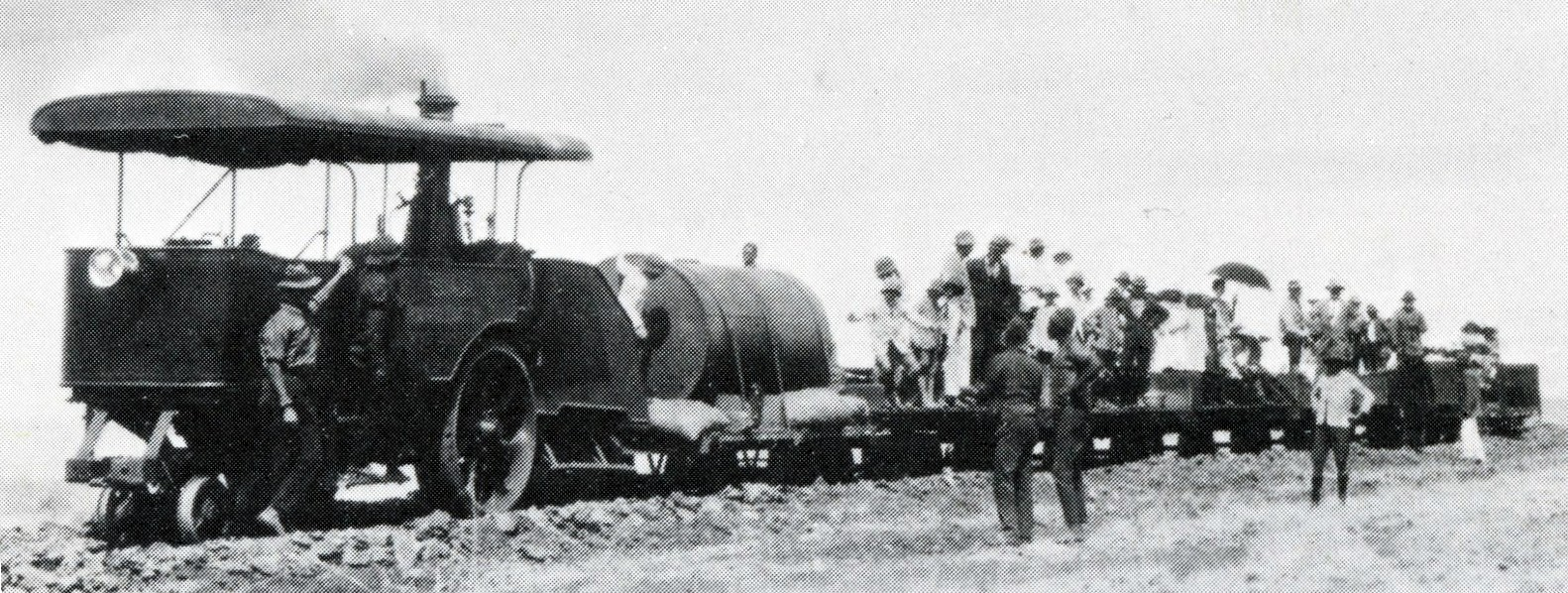
Dutton bi-directional rail-only tractor no. RR1155, rebuilt from a Yorkshire steam tractor, in service with a water tank tender on the Singlewood branch, c. 1925
