= List of things named after David Attenborough and his works =

This is a list of things named after English broadcaster, biologist, natural historian and author Sir David Attenborough, and his audiovisual works.

== Taxonomy ==
David Attenborough's long trajectory working on nature documentaries and supporting conservation initiatives has made him an inspiration and a popular choice among naturalists to honour him with eponyms when naming newly described organisms. Attenborough himself has said that this is the "biggest of compliments that you could ask from any scientific community."

As of 2022, there are more than 50 taxa (genera and species) of organisms that have been named after David Attenborough. Additionally, there is at least one species named after one of his documentary series.

This list presents the scientific names as originally given (their basionyms). By default, they are shown in the chronological order in which they were published. They can also be ordered alphabetically by genus or by type of organism.

Pink background shading indicates that this species name has been synonymised and is no longer in use

Taxon	Type	Notes	Taxon image	Ref
Oedura attenboroughi Wells & Wellington, 1985	Lizard	This name for an Australian gecko was published in one of the papers involved in the Wells and Wellington affair. Like most of the species from these papers, it was subsequently synonymised, in this case with Oedura monilis (Ocellated velvet gecko). Nevertheless, it remains the first instance of an organism being scientifically named after David Attenborough.		
Attenborosaurus † Bakker, 1993	Plesiosaur	A genus of pliosaurid from the Early Jurassic of Dorset, England, named "in honor of the naturalist and filmmaker, whose childhood fascination with Liassic plesiosaurs sparked a brilliant career in scientific journalism." In a 2015 interview with The Washington Post, Attenborough said that this was his favourite out of all his eponymous organisms: "to have a species named after you, an attenboroughi species, that's quite nice. But to have a genus named after you is really something else. [...] Attenborosaurus is really something. Actually, the type specimen of Attenborosaurus is in the Natural History Museum in London. And so I, when they changed the label, I leant nonchalantly beside this thing with the label above. People walked by and didn't take any notice at all. So that put me in my place!"		
Apoleptomastix attenboroughi Noyes & Hayat, 1994	Wasp	An encyrtid parasitoid of mealybugs found in India and China; "The species is named in honour of Sir David Attenborough in recognition of his infectious enthusiasm for the study of natural history."		
Zaglossus attenboroughi Flannery & Groves, 1998	Echidna	This critically endangered species was described from a single known specimen collected in 1961 from the Cyclops Mountains in Papua province, Indonesia, and named "For Sir David Attenborough, who has contributed greatly to the public appreciation of the New Guinean fauna and flora."		
Materpiscis attenboroughi † Long et al., 2008	Fish	A fossil placoderm from the Devonian of Australia, this is the oldest known example of any creature giving birth to live young. (hence the genus name, which means "Mother fish" in Latin); the species is named "in honour of Sir David Attenborough, who first drew attention to the Gogo fish sites in his 1979 series Life on Earth."		
Nepenthes attenboroughii A.S.Rob., S.McPherson & V.B.Heinrich	Flowering plant	A carnivorous pitcher plant endemic to Palawan, Philippines, named "after broadcaster and naturalist, Sir David Attenborough, whose outstanding television documentaries have made the world's natural history accessible and understandable to millions. As a keen enthusiast of the genus and a patron of Philippine conservation efforts, it is fitting that this spectacular new species be dedicated to him on the occasion of his 80th birthday". In 2010, the International Institute for Species Exploration at Arizona State University selected N. attenboroughii as one of the "top 10 new species described in 2009". It later appeared on the 2012 list of the world's 100 most threatened species.		
Blakea attenboroughii Penneys	Flowering plant	A plant native to the Andes of Ecuador, named "in honor of the great natural historian, Sir David Attenborough, whose fundraising efforts permitted the land where it was discovered to be purchased."		
Ctenocheloides attenboroughi Anker, 2010	Crustacean	A ghost shrimp from the coast of Madagascar. "It is a great honour for the author to name this unique species after Sir David Attenborough, a famous British naturalist and presenter of numerous nature documentaries, including the spectacular The Blue Planet – Seas of Life (BBC 2001)"		
Prethopalpus attenboroughi Baehr & Harvey, 2012	Spider	A tiny goblin spider found only on Horn Island off northern Queensland in Australia, "named for the eminent naturalist David Attenborough in honor of his contributions to recognizing the beauty and splendor of the world's biodiversity."		
Agapornis attenboroughi † Manegold, 2013	Bird	A fossil species of lovebird from the Pliocene of South Africa, "Dedicated to Sir David Attenborough in recognition of his love of birds and his passionate commitment in presenting all natural history and evolution worldwide to a broad audience."		
Cavisternum attenboroughi Baehr, Raven & Whyte, 2013	Spider	A goblin spider from Australia, named "honouring the work of media presenter and naturalist Sir David Attenborough because of his contributions in recognizing the magnificence of the world's biodiversity and his support for life on planet earth."		
Polioptila attenboroughi Whittacker et al., 2013	Bird	A small songbird from the Amazon known as Inambari gnatcatcher, "named in honor of Sir David Frederick Attenborough who has long been a mentor to many generations of ornithologists. (...) Sir David has done an outstanding job documenting important current topics such as global warming and the alarming numbers of species that humans are driving towards extinction, and confirming the essential need for us to do a much better job of conserving our planet's precious nature for future generations to enjoy."		
Electrotettix attenboroughi † Heads et al., 2014	Groundhopper	A fossil species found in Dominican amber from the Miocene. "The specific epithet is a patronym honouring Sir David Attenborough, British naturalist and filmmaker, who has been an inspiration not only to the authors of this paper, but to an entire generation of natural scientists."		
Hieracium attenboroughianum T.C.G.Rich	Flowering plant	A species of hawkweed found only in the Brecon Beacons in south Wales. Its discoverer Tim Rich wrote "I have named this species in honour of Sir David Frederick Attenborough whose World about us series on BBC television inspired me to study ecology when I was 17. I have watched and admired his work ever since, as have many other people, and in naming this hawkweed pay tribute to him for so eloquently educating us about the natural world." Rich also told The Guardian "This is a personal thank you for the years of fascination he has given me going to different places to search for new things." Sir David said he was delighted at the honour. "I am thrilled that my name has been given to the delightful new species of hawkweed," he said. "Bestowing a name on a new species is surely one of the greatest of biological compliments and I am truly grateful. It is an added joy that Hieracium attenboroughianum should be so beautiful and live in such a lovely part of the country." This was the first living species from the United Kingdom to be named after David Attenborough.		
Trigonopterus attenboroughi Riedel, 2014	Beetle	A flightless weevil found in West Kalimantan, Indonesia, "named in honour of Sir David F. Attenborough in recognition of his outstanding documentaries on natural history."		
Sirdavidia Couvreur & Sauquet	Flowering plant	A genus of trees in the soursop family, found in Gabon. "We dedicate this new genus to Sir David Attenborough, British broadcaster and naturalist, in honor of his lifelong dedication to nature, conservation, evolution and natural history programs. His passion for nature have influenced and inspired a generation of biologists and naturalists, including the first and senior authors of this paper."		
Platysaurus attenboroughi Whiting, Branch, Pepper & Keogh, 2015	Lizard	"We name this new species in honour of Sir David F. Attenborough, in recognition of his immense contribution to the public understanding and appreciation of animals, plants, ecosystems and nature in general. David Attenborough made flat lizards, specifically the closely related Platysaurus broadleyi, famous in the BBC documentary series Life in Cold Blood"		
Euptychia attenboroughi Neild, Nakahara, Fratello & Le Crom, 2015	Butterfly	"We name this butterfly to honour the great English naturalist, author, and TV presenter, Sir David Attenborough, in gratitude for opening the eyes and hearts of millions to the natural world through his inspiring and edifying work."		
Acisoma attenboroughi Mens et al. 2016	Dragonfly	"The new species honours Sir David Attenborough on his 90th birthday. His documentaries inspired entire generations to love and conserve nature."		
Microleo attenboroughi † Gillespie, Archer & Hand, 2016	Marsupial mammal	A fossil species of small predator from the Early Miocene of Australia. "The species name honours Sir David Attenborough for his dedication and enthusiasm in promoting the natural history of the world and the palaeontological treasures of the Riversleigh World Heritage Area in particular."		
Cichlidogyrus attenboroughi Kmentová et al., 2016	Flatworm	A parasitic monogenean flatworm found in cichlid fish of Lake Tanganyika. "The species epithet honours the English scientist and broadcaster Sir David Frederick Attenborough, in gratitude for the insights and inspiration he gave to so many people to study and protect nature and biodiversity"		
Succinalophus attenboroughi † Legalov, 2016	Beetle	A fossil species found in Baltic amber from the Eocene of Kaliningrad Oblast. "The name is dedicated to Sir David F. Attenborough (London, UK), for his great contribution [to] popularizing natural history."		
Kingsleya attenboroughi Pinheiro & Santana, 2016	Crustacean	"in honor of the English naturalist Sir David Attenborough, a devoted naturalist and communicator of science that promotes environmental education and protection, including in the Chapada do Araripe, from where this species appears to be endemic."		
Pristimantis attenboroughi Lehr & von May 2017	Frog	"We dedicate this species to Sir David Frederick Attenborough in honor for his educational documentaries on wildlife, especially on amphibians (e.g., Life in Cold Blood, Fabulous Frogs), and for raising awareness about the importance of wildlife conservation."		
Micridium attenboroughi Darby, 2017	Beetle	A featherwing beetle from Bolivia. "I have great pleasure in naming this species after Sir David Attenborough, the British naturalist and broadcaster, who has recently celebrated his 90th birthday."		
Cascolus ravitis † Siveter et al., 2017	Crustacean	A fossil Leptostracan (later considered as non-crustacean mandibulate) from the Silurian Coalbrookdale Formation of Herefordshire, UK, "named in honour of the naturalist and broadcaster Sir David Attenborough, who grew up on University College Leicester campus [where the lead author is a professor], in celebration of his 90th birthday. Latin castrum 'stronghold' and colus 'dwelling in'; alluding to the Middle/Old English source for the surname 'Attenborough', derived from atten 'at the' and burgh 'a fortified place'. Latin Ratae, the Roman name for Leicester, vita 'life' and commeatis 'a messenger'." David Attenborough said "The biggest compliment that a biologist or paleontologist can pay to another one is to name a fossil in his honor and I take this as a very great compliment."		
Corita attenboroughi Urra, 2017	Moth	"The name of the species is dedicated to Sir David Frederick Attenborough, English naturalist and documentary filmmaker, who, through his programmes, encouraged me to study the natural world."		
Myotis attenboroughi Moratelli et al., 2017	Bat	"[Attenborough's] pioneering and tireless work has been a great contribution to the diffusion of knowledge of the natural world and natural sciences, and has inspired generations of wildlife biologists, naturalists, and filmmakers interested in the natural world. We suggest the vernacular name "Sir David Attenborough's Myotis.""		
Attenborougharion Hyman & Köhler, 2017	Snail	A Tasmanian semi-slug "Named for Sir David Attenborough, Lifetime Patron of the Australian Museum, in recognition of his lifetime's contribution to the fields of natural science and conservation."		
Mesosticta davidattenboroughi † Zheng et al., 2017	Damselfly	A fossil species found in Cretaceous Burmese amber, named "in honour of Sir David Attenborough, on his 90th birthday, for his appreciation of dragonflies." Co-author Professor E. A. Jarzembowski said, "Dragonflies in amber are extremely rare and the recent discoveries by my Chinese colleagues are a new window on the past. It is tradition in taxonomy [...] to contact the person concerned. Sir David was delighted because he is not only interested in the story of amber, but also a president of the British Dragonfly Society."		
Spintharus davidattenboroughi Agnarsson & Van Patten, 2017	Spider	"The species epithet honours Sir David Attenborough for his extraordinary effort to enlighten the public about the wonders of the natural world, to make humanity care about nature, and for inspiring countless people to pursue the study of biology, the current authors included."		
Palaina attenboroughi Greke, 2017	Snail	"With pleasure I name this species in honour of Sir David Frederick Attenborough (London, United Kingdom), the famous British naturalist and broadcaster, who devoted most of his life nature conservation through education."		
Stumpffia davidattenboroughi Rakotoarison et al., 2017	Frog	A small narrow-mouthed frog known only from Betampona Reserve in Madagascar. "We dedicate this species to Sir David Attenborough, who celebrated his 91st birthday on the 8th of May 2017, in recognition of his services to science communication and natural history broadcasting with the BBC for the last 65 years. Sir David first visited Madagascar in the 1960s, and has been an ambassador for the island's wildlife, and for threatened wildlife around the globe, throughout his long career."		
Sitana attenboroughii Sadasivan et al. 2018	Lizard	A fan-throated lizard from Kerala, India, named in honour of "the celebrated naturalist and broadcaster Sir David Frederick Attenborough for his contribution towards natural history documentation and wildlife conservation." Subsequently synonymised with Sitana marudhamneydhal.		
Diversinitus attenboroughi † Haas, Burks & Krogmann, 2018	Wasp	A fossil species found in Cretaceous Burmese amber, "Named after the well renowned British broadcaster and naturalist Sir David Frederick Attenborough for his inspiring enthusiasm and devotion to natural sciences. This species was dedicated to Sir Attenborough during his visit to the SMNS on the occasion of his 91st birthday."		
Syracosphaera azureaplaneta Young et al., 2018	Protist	An oceanic coccolithophore "named for the documentary series The Blue Planet, in recognition of its and its presenter Sir David Attenborough's work in promoting understanding of the marine realm."		
Epeolus attenboroughi Onuferko, 2018	Bee	"named in honor of English broadcaster and naturalist Sir David Attenborough in recognition of his inspiring books and television programs on natural history."		
Attenborites † Droser et al., 2018	Ediacaran biota	"after Sir David Attenborough in honour of his contributions to communicating the importance of the Ediacara biota specifically, and paleontology in general."		
Sylvicanthon attenboroughi Cupello & Vaz-de-Mello, 2018	Beetle	"A tribute to the great British naturalist and broadcaster Sir David Attenborough. In recognition of his profoundly influential work on the public understanding of natural history and evolutionary biology, which, for more than six decades, has been inspiring young people of successive generations (including the first author) to pursue a career as a biologist and the general public to know and preserve the beautiful world in which we live. We paraphrase him: 'I did so because I know of no pleasure deeper than that which comes from contemplating the natural world and trying to understand it'."		
Malmidea attenboroughii Kukwa & B. Guzow-Krzem. (2019)	Lichen	"The species is named after Sir David F. Attenborough, an English broadcaster and naturalist, for his major contributions to the popularization of knowledge about biodiversity and nature protection."		
Pachytephraea attenboroughi Malec & De Palma, 2020	Beetle	A flower chafer from Tanzania, named "in honor of Sir David Frederick Attenborough, English natural historian whose documentaries instigated our interest in the natural sciences during infancy. We owe him for the privilege of that education."		
Mnioes attenboroughi Alvarado, 2020	Wasp	The name honours Sir David Attenborough "for raising awareness about the importance of wildlife conservation and his educational documentaries on wildlife that inspired many biologists, among them the author."		
Chespiritos attenboroughi Kuwahara & Marshall, 2020	Fly	A lesser dung fly from Argentina, named "in honour of Sir David Attenborough, whose programs about, and advocacy of, wildlife conservation helped inspire the first author to pursue a career in the biological sciences."		
Nothobranchius attenboroughi Nagy, Watters & Bellstedt, 2020	Fish	An African killifish named "in honour of Sir David F. Attenborough, in recognition of his dedicated efforts to promote biophilia: raising awareness of the wonders and beauties of nature for so many people worldwide, promoting awareness of the importance of biodiversity conservation, and above all, inspiring so many researchers in the field of natural history, including the authors."		
Titanodula attenboroughi Vermeersch, 2020	Mantis	"dedicated to Sir David Attenborough, one of the world's most beloved naturalists, in acknowledgment for his life-long endeavours to disseminate knowledge on all the beings that are part of the natural world and to advocate for their protection and conservation."		
Attenboroughctena Ceccolini & Cianferoni, 2020	Comb jelly	Replacement name for Ceroctena Carré & Carré, 1991, which was preoccupied by Ceroctena Guenée, 1852 (a genus of moths); "dedicated to the English naturalist and documentary filmmaker Sir David Attenborough for his remarkable effort in making popular the Natural Sciences to a general audience."		
Azygophleps attenboroughi Yakovlev, Müller & Kravchenko, 2020	Moth	A carpenter moth from Mali, "dedicated to Sir David Frederick Attenborough, world-famous English broadcaster and natural historian."		
Stenus attenboroughi Mainda, 2021	Beetle	"in honor of Sir David Attenborough, whose outstanding documentaries have made the beauty of the natural world accessible to millions of people. But they have also shown how vulnerable our planet is and that its biodiversity is critically endangered, if humanity does not change its current course."		
Caipirasuchus attenboroughi † Ruiz et al., 2021	Crocodylomorph	A fossil notosuchian from the Cretaceous of Brazil. "The specific name is given in honour of Sir David Attenborough, a palaeontology enthusiast and fossil collector who sparked in many minds, including the first author of this study, an interest in life on Earth both past and present."		
Smicromorpha attenboroughi Binoy, 2021	Wasp	A parasitoid wasp from India named "after the naturalist and broadcaster, Sir David Frederick Attenborough for making the world's natural history accessible and understandable to millions with his outstanding documentaries."		
Dasyproctus attenboroughi Binoy, Santhosh & Girish Kumar 2021	Wasp	A crabronin wasp from India named "after the naturalist and broadcaster, Sir David Frederick Attenborough for making the world's natural history accessible and understandable to millions with his outstanding documentaries."		
Attenborolimulus † Bicknell & Shcherbakov, 2021	Horseshoe crab	A fossil genus from the Triassic of Orenburg Oblast, Russia. "The generic name is given in honour of Sir David Attenborough and his unparalleled contributions to natural history and conservation. His last name is combined with Limulus — the most-well documented extant xiphosurid genus."		
Pulchritudo attenboroughi † Krell & Vitali, 2021	Beetle	A fossil species from the Eocene Green River Formation in Colorado, USA, "dedicated to Sir David Frederick Attenborough, broadcaster and naturalist, who has nothing to do with this fossil but has been inspiring the authors, their family down to the littlest, and millions of others by his unsurpassed documentaries on the natural world, extant and bygone. Nobody imparts the grandeur and beauty of nature more impressively than Sir David. This fossil, unique in its preservation and beauty, is an apt specimen to honour the great man."		
Auroralumina attenboroughii † Dunn et al., 2022	Cnidarian	A 560-million-year-old fossil, thought to be the earliest creature known to have a skeleton and the earliest animal predator. It is related to the group that includes corals, jellyfish and anemones. Named "after Sir David Attenborough for his work raising awareness of the Ediacaran fossils of Charnwood Forest."		
Lepanthes attenboroughii Baquero & Yeager	Orchid	A miniature orchid from Peru "named in honor of Sir David Attenborough whose life has been dedicated to educating and inspiring generations of naturalists and conservationists, and most recently been a vocal advocate with his fervent call to action in response to global climate change."		
Marphysa davidattenboroughi Lavesque et al., 2023	Polychaete worm	A marine worm from the southeast coast of Australia, "dedicated to the legend and great naturalist Sir David Attenborough, Lifetime Patron of the Australian Museum, for educating generations on the importance of observing and protecting nature."		
Imparavis attenboroughi †; Wang et al., 2024	Enantiornithine bird	A fossil enantiornithine bird from the Cretaceous of Liaoning, China. The specific name "is in honor of Sir David Attenborough for his influential work in presenting natural history to the general public and his far-reaching advocacy of extant wildlife conservation". The full binomial is interpreted as "Attenborough's odd bird".		
Gibellula attenboroughii H.C. Evans & J.P.M. Araújo (2025)	Fungus	A parasitic fungus which attacks spiders, first discovered in 2021 during the BBC Winterwatch television series, where a specimen was found in an abandoned storeroom at Castle Espie in Northern Ireland. Images sent by the BBC to the senior author suggested that this was a novel species and, moreover, that the reclusive cave-spider host – the orb-weaving spider Metellina merianae – had moved to an exposed situation before death, indicating a behavioural change. These suppositions were included and discussed in the following 2022 Springwatch series after which the specimen was removed and sent for identification. It was "Named after the broadcaster and natural historian Sir David Attenborough, a pioneer of BBC natural history programmes, who – in his role as controller of BBC2 – helped to develop the Natural History Unit; leading, indirectly, to the present nature series during which the new species was first discovered." This was the second living species from the United Kingdom to be named after Attenborough.		
Attenboroughnculus De Ketelaere & Broad, 2026	Wasp	"This unique genus from Chile has been named after Sir David Attenborough ahead of his 100th birthday, celebrating the broadcaster and biologist's highly distinctive contribution to our understanding of the natural world. David Attenborough has featured Chile's diverse, extreme landscapes in several documentaries, emphasising the unique environmental challenges and ecological resilience of species within the country. Sir David has also filmed several scenes with parasitoid wasps, famously termed the 'bodysnatcher wasp' by the broadcaster in The Trials of Life, first broadcast in 1990. He has used his work to reveal the intimate, unseen or overlooked within nature. This resonates in the discovery of this species in an unsorted drawer within the collections of the Natural History Museum, London. In 2023 Sir David revealed a new bronze quote outside the Natural History Museum, London, reading: The future of the natural world, on which we all depend, is in our hands. We are using this opportunity to echo this message through the naming of this new genus of tiny wasp. We hope to inspire global scientists to take another look in their collections to see if there is something small that could contribute to our collective understanding and therefore the future of our natural world."		
Iberoacarus davidi Moraza & Cuesta-Segura, 2026	Mite	An opilioacarid from Andorra, whose specific epithet is "formed directly from the modern personal name David, in honor of Sir David Attenborough, the British broadcaster, biologist, natural historian and writer, in recognition of his lifelong contributions to science communication and natural history. His work has inspired generations of biologists worldwide, including the second author of this study."		

== Buildings ==
- David Attenborough Building in Cambridge, which houses the Cambridge University Museum of Zoology and the Cambridge Conservation Initiative (CCI).

== Ships ==
- RRS Sir David Attenborough, a British polar research ship; famously involved in the Boaty McBoatface naming poll controversy.

== School houses ==
A number of British schools which divided pupils into houses have named one of their houses after Attenborough. They include:

- Cheltenham Bournside School
- Latimer Arts College
- Northstowe Secondary College
- Rugby Free Secondary School
- Tomlinscote School
- The Warriner School
- Wilmington Grammar School for Boys

== See also ==
- List of organisms named after famous people
