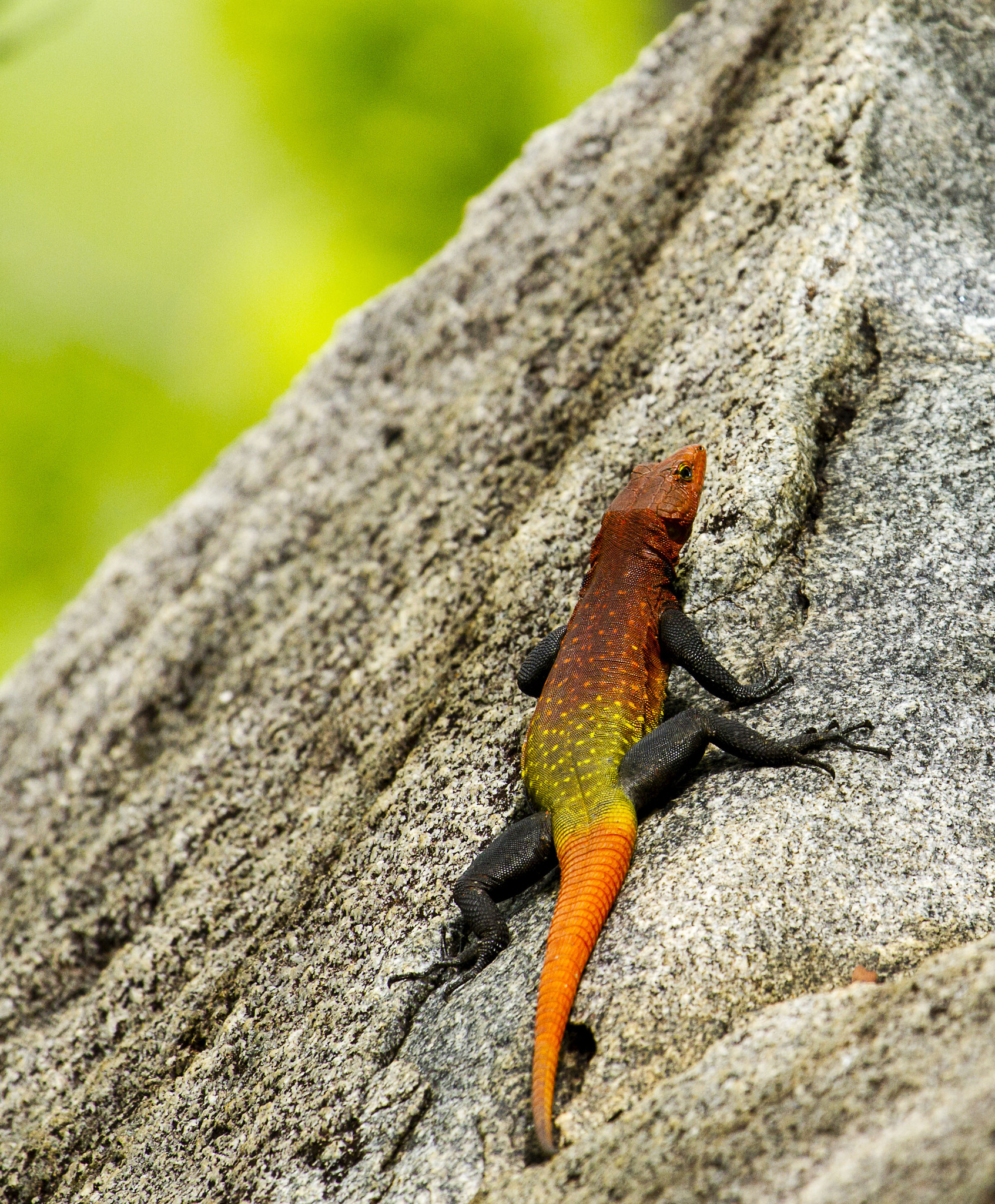

Conservation status
- Near Threatened (IUCN 3.1)

Scientific classification
- Domain: Eukaryota
- Kingdom: Animalia
- Phylum: Chordata
- Class: Reptilia
- Order: Squamata
- Family: Cordylidae
- Genus: Platysaurus
- Species: P. imperator

Binomial name
- Platysaurus imperator Broadley, 1962

= Emperor flat lizard =

Species of lizard

The emperor flat lizard or imperial flat lizard (Platysaurus imperator) is a species of lizard in the Cordylidae family.

== Description ==
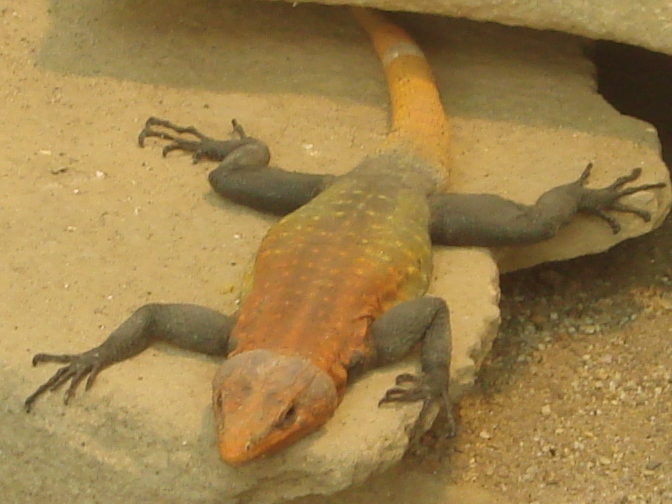
P. imperator

Females and juveniles are black and have three light cream stripes, which are yellow on the head, running down the lizard's back. The middle stripe is narrow and broken near the rear, and the tail is straw-colored. The throat is white, while the belly is mainly black. Adult males have a yellow head and a dark red body with several large, whitish spots anteriorly. These pale spots are yellowish near the tail. The limbs are black, while the throat is dark red with a thick black collar. The chest is reddish or yellowish while the tail is orange to light yellow below. Like the females and juveniles, the belly is black.

This Platysaurus is the largest of its kind, with males reaching 146 mm. The common flat lizard, Platysaurus intermedius, is closely related, but the emperor flat lizard is easily distinguishable by its large size and striking colors.

== Geography ==
The emperor flat lizard's range is northeastern Zimbabwe and the adjacent part of Mozambique. Its habitat is mesic savanna. These lizards will often live on top of boulders on hills.

== Habits ==
A large male emperor flat lizard and several attendant females command the tops of huge boulders on hills, where they feed on beetles, grubs, and ants. Emperor flat lizards have been documented living up to fourteen years.

== Breeding ==
Clutches of two eggs are laid in the summer. These eggs are large, with dimensions of 27 mm long by 12 mm wide.

== Conservation ==
Emperor flat lizards are threatened by over-collecting for the pet trade.

== See also ==
- Platysaurus
- Cordylidae
