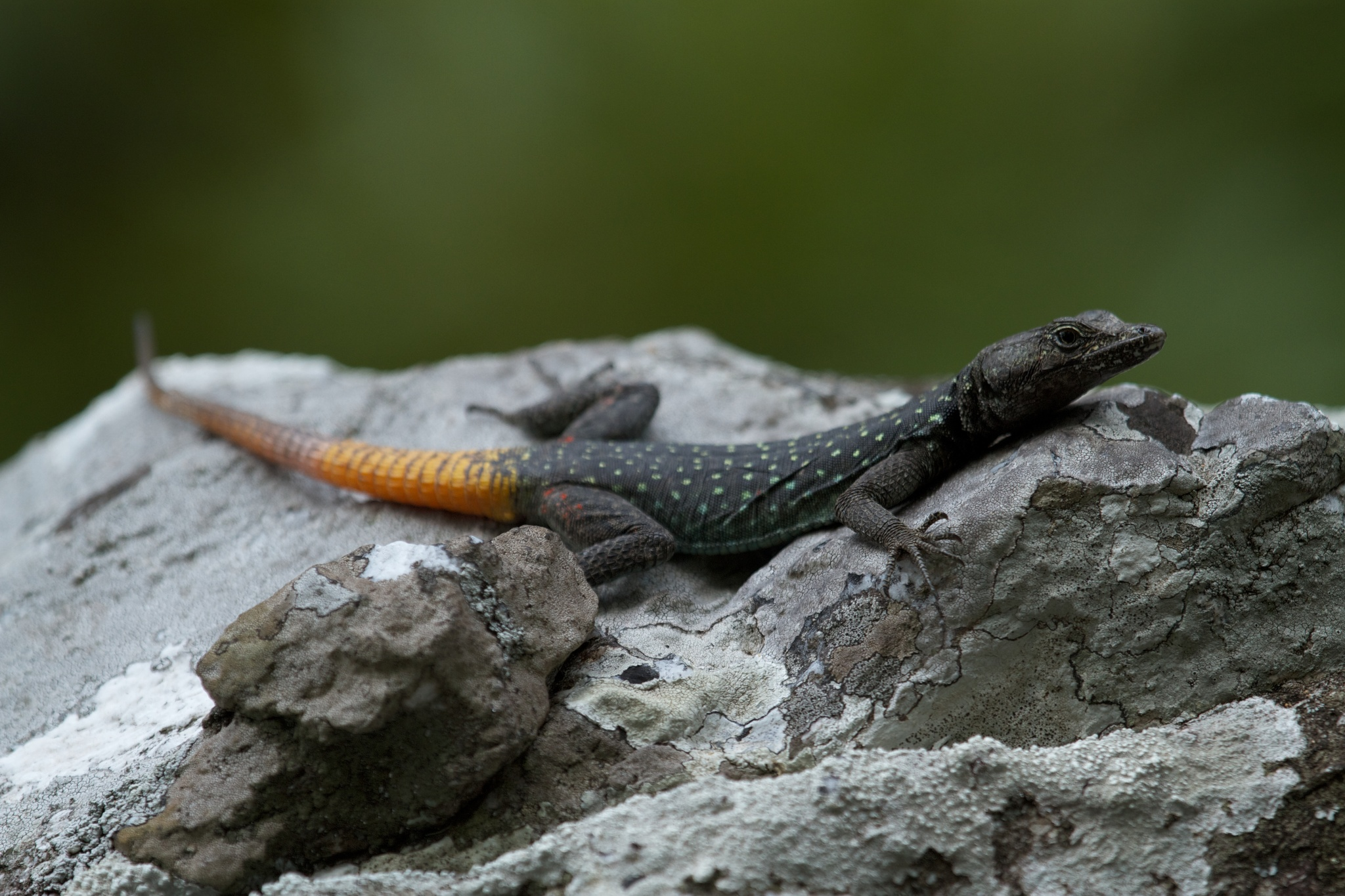

Conservation status
- Least Concern (IUCN 3.1)

Scientific classification
- Kingdom: Animalia
- Phylum: Chordata
- Class: Reptilia
- Order: Squamata
- Suborder: Scinciformata
- Infraorder: Scincomorpha
- Family: Cordylidae
- Genus: Platysaurus
- Species: P. ocellatus

Binomial name
- Platysaurus ocellatus Broadley, 1962

= Ocellated flat lizard =

Species of lizard

The ocellated flat lizard or Chimanimani flat lizard (Platysaurus ocellatus) is a species of lizard in the family Cordylidae. It is endemic to the Chimanimani Mountains of south eastern Zimbabwe and western Mozambique.

== Description ==
Ocellated flat lizards are similar to the Cape flat lizard. They have a flat body which is covered in granular scales and a flattened triangular shaped head. The tail is long and tapered with lateral spines. Females and juveniles are brown with white spots. The larger males are also brown, with a black head. The tail is orange-yellow underneath. Unlike other Platysaurus species the females and juveniles of the ocellated flat lizard do not have three lateral white stripes on the dorsum.

== Habitat and distribution ==
The ocellated flat lizard lives in woodlands with quartzite rocks in the Chimanimani Mountains of eastern Zimbabwe and western Mozambique.

== Habits ==
Ocellated flat lizards eat beetles and plant matters (flowers, leaves, and seeds). They lay two eggs in October or November which are laid communally with other females within cracks in the rocks. The compressed shape of their bodies allows them to shelter in cracks in rocks and other crevices. They are gregarious and can be seen in groups. However males engage in competition over space and access to females and display by exposing their brightly colored bellies by tilting sideways, or lift the head and shoulders up on stiffened front legs, showing off the bright colours of the throat and chest.

== Conservation ==
The ocellated flat lizard has a very restricted range and is classified as endangered in Mozambique.

== See also ==
- Platysaurus
- Cordylidae
