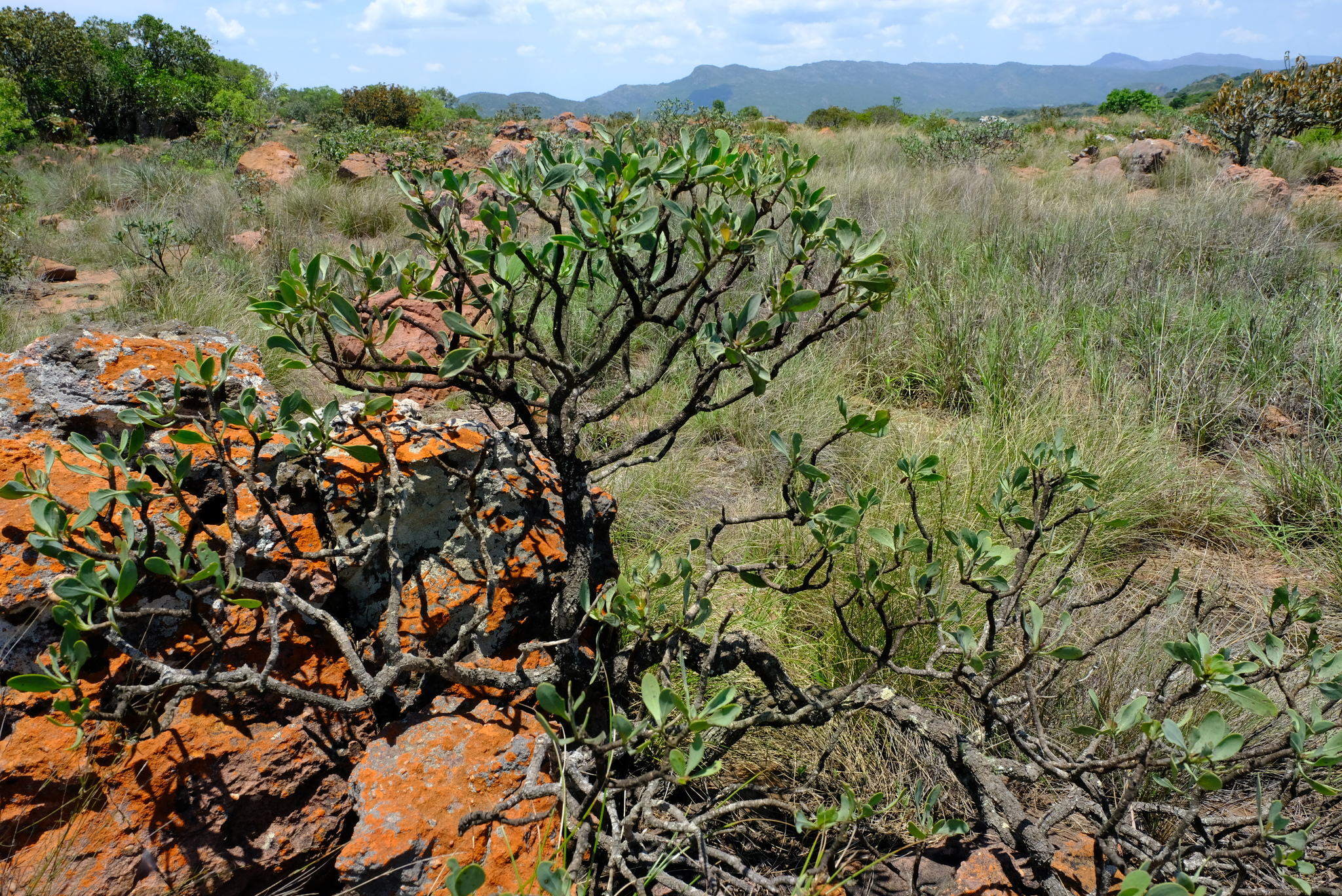

Scientific classification
- Kingdom: Plantae
- Clade: Tracheophytes
- Clade: Angiosperms
- Clade: Eudicots
- Clade: Asterids
- Order: Asterales
- Family: Asteraceae
- Genus: Lopholaena
- Species: L. festiva

Binomial name
- Lopholaena festiva Brusse

= Lopholaena festiva =

South African plant species

Lopholaena festiva, or the shiny fluff-bush, is a species of plant from South Africa.

== Description ==
=== Branches ===
This shrub grows up to 155 cm (61 in) tall, with a main stem with a diameter of up to 6.5 cm (2.6 in). It is covered in rough greyish bark. The secondary branches (which have a diameter of up to 1 cm (0.39 in)) are brown with longitudinal fissures and leaf scars. The tertiary branches are brown with deep longitudinal wrinkles and have jutting out leaf scars. The young branches are black with sooty moulds.

=== Leaves ===
The hairless leaves are alternately arranged on grow directly on the branches. They are light green in colour and are 30–73 mm (1.2–2.9 in) long and 10–30 mm (0.39–1.18 in) wide. The veins, while mostly invisible, curve towards the margins. Sometimes two lateral veins will be visible.

=== Flowers ===
White flowers are borne in terminal corymbs. Each inflorescence is about 5 cm (2.0 in) wide, commonly being made up of seven flowers. They emit a honey-like scent. It starts off cylindrical, but becomes disc shaped, flaring above. They are surrounded by linear bracts that are woolly in the axils. The tops of the anthers are commonly purple and are clearly visible in open flowers.

=== Fruits ===
This plant produces achenes - small, dry fruits that contain a single seed. They are brown with a slight white sheen as a consequence of the sparse hairs.

=== Similar species ===
This plant is most similar to Lopholaena cneorifolia. L. festiva, however, has much wider hairs and fewer hairs on the achenes (which are a silvery white in L. cneorifolia as a result of the hairs). L. festiva also has fewer spinules per intercolpar area (23-28) than L. cneorifolia (36-38) in the pollen.

== Distribution and habitat ==
This plant is endemic to the Limpopo province of South Africa. This mountainous species prefers northern slopes at elevations of 1,100–1,600 m (3,600–5,200 ft). It is known from the Blouberg, the Soutpansberg, the Strydpoortberg, and the northern parts of the Drakensberg. It is often found growing from cracks in quartzite or sandstone rock faces, fully exposed to the sun in the absence of surrounding vegetation, although it may sometimes be found on wooded slopes.

== Conservation ==
This species is considered to be of least concern by the South African National Biodiversity Institute.
