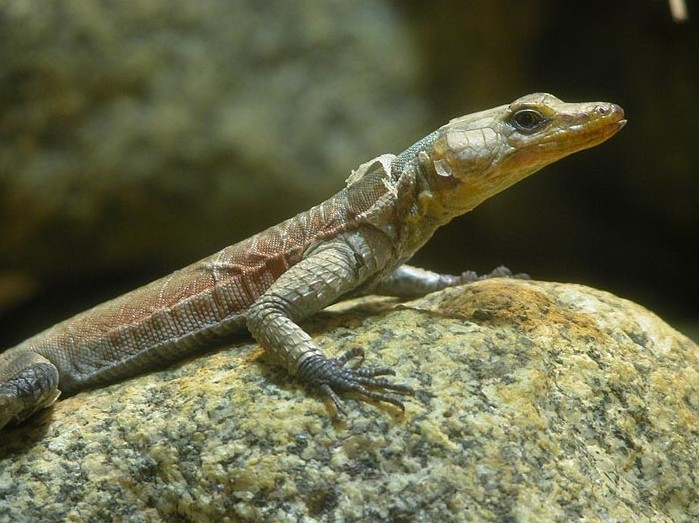
- Individual at the Frankfurt Zoo

Conservation status
- Least Concern (IUCN 3.1)

Scientific classification
- Kingdom: Animalia
- Phylum: Chordata
- Class: Reptilia
- Order: Squamata
- Family: Cordylidae
- Genus: Platysaurus
- Species: P. pungweensis

Binomial name
- Platysaurus pungweensis Broadley, 1959

= Pungwe flat lizard =

Species of lizard

The Pungwe flat lizard (Platysaurus pungweensis) is a species of lizard in the Cordylidae family.

== Description ==
Females and juveniles of the Pungwe flat lizard are black and striped on their backs. Males vary by subspecies. The species resembles the common flat lizard, Platysaurus intermedius.

== Geography ==
Pungwe flat lizards live in eastern Zimbabwe and adjacent Mozambique. The type was obtained at the Pungwe River at 730 m (2,400 ft) above sea level, near the eastern border of Rhodesia (current Zimbabwe).

== Habitat and ecology ==
Pungwe flat lizards inhabit low rock outcrops and large hills in mesic savanna. They eat ants and beetles.

== Subspecies ==
Two subspecies are accepted:

- P. p. pungweensis – Eastern Highlands of Zimbabwe and adjacent Mozambique
- P. p. blakei Broadley, 1964 – outcrops and inselbergs in the lowlands of southern Manica Platform, central Mozambique. Type locality 24 kilometres (15 miles) southeast of Vila de Manica.
