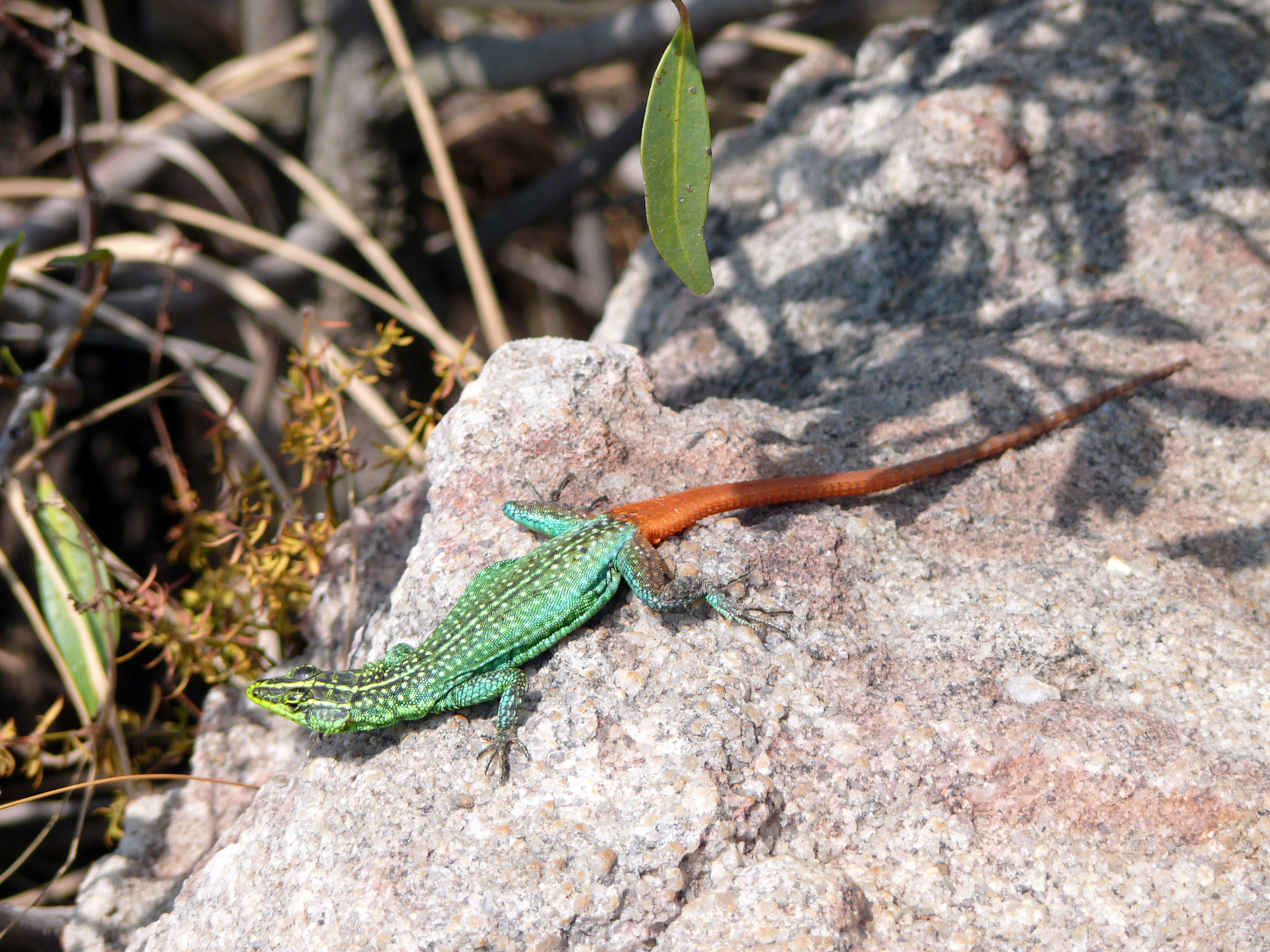

Conservation status
- Least Concern (IUCN 3.1)

Scientific classification
- Kingdom: Animalia
- Phylum: Chordata
- Class: Reptilia
- Order: Squamata
- Family: Cordylidae
- Genus: Platysaurus
- Species: P. orientalis

Binomial name
- Platysaurus orientalis V. FitzSimons, 1941

Synonyms
- Platysaurus minor orientalis V. FitzSimons, 1941; Platysaurus guttatus orientalis — Loveridge, 1944; Platysaurus orientalis — Jacobsen & Newbery, 1989

= Sekukhune flat lizard =

Sekukhune flat lizard (pempenyane in Pedi language)

Species of lizard

The Sekukhune flat lizard (Platysaurus orientalis) is a species of lizard in the family Cordylidae. The species is endemic to South Africa. It has two subspecies.

== Description ==
Females and juveniles of P. orientalis have a black back with white stripes, as well as a white belly. Adult males have a green body, and a tail which is orange or red above, and yellow underneath. Adults usually have a snout-to-vent length (SVL) of 7.0–7.5 cm (2.8–3.0 in); the longest recorded SVL is 9.0 cm (3.5 in).

== Geographic range and habitat ==
The Sekukhune flat lizard lives in a small area of savannah in South Africa in the Sekhukhuneland natural region. This includes the Mpumalanga Escarpment.

== Reproduction ==
Female Sekukhune flat lizards lay two eggs in a rock crack in early summer.

== Diet ==
The diet of the Sekukhune flat lizard includes insects, including caterpillars.

== Subspecies ==
Two subspecies are recognized.

- P. o. orientalis V. FitzSimons, 1941 – Drakensberg mountains in Mpumalanga in South Africa.
- P. o. fitzsimonsi Loveridge, 1944 – eastern Sekhukhuneland.

The subspecific name, fitzsimonsi, is in honor of South African herpetologist (Mr.) Vivian Frederick Maynard FitzSimons.

== See also ==
- Platysaurus
- Cordylidae
