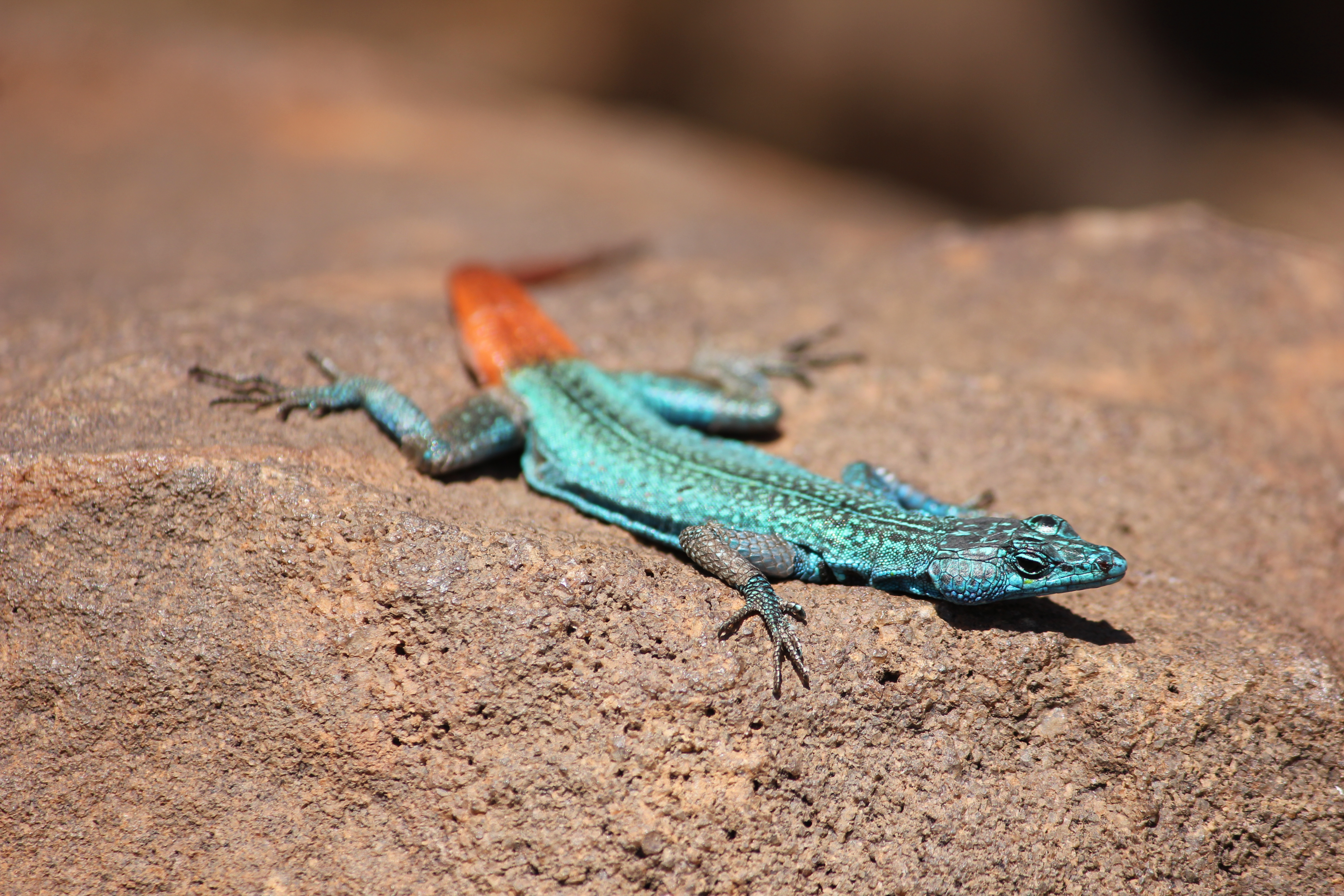
- In the Soutpansberg, Limpopo, South Africa

Conservation status
- Near Threatened (IUCN 3.1)

Scientific classification
- Kingdom: Animalia
- Phylum: Chordata
- Class: Reptilia
- Order: Squamata
- Suborder: Scinciformata
- Infraorder: Scincomorpha
- Family: Cordylidae
- Genus: Platysaurus
- Species: P. relictus

Binomial name
- Platysaurus relictus Broadley, 1976

= Soutpansberg flat lizard =

Species of lizard

The Soutpansberg flat lizard (Platysaurus relictus) is a species of lizard in the Cordylidae family.

== Description ==
The females and juveniles of this Platysaurus are brown on their backs and yellow on their tails. Adult males, however, are green-yellow on their bodies and blue on their neck and belly. There is a collar.

== Geography ==
This lizard is endemic to South Africa, including Waterberg and Soutpansberg. Its habitat is savannah.

== Habits ==
This is a quick and alert lizard, living on sandstone outcrops.

== Conservation ==
The Soutpansberg flat lizard is a near-threatened species.

== See also ==
- Platysaurus
- Cordylidae
