= Prethopalpus marionae =

Scientific classification
- Domain: Eukaryota
- Kingdom: Animalia
- Phylum: Arthropoda
- Subphylum: Chelicerata
- Class: Arachnida
- Order: Araneae
- Infraorder: Araneomorphae
- Family: Oonopidae
- Genus: Prethopalpus
- Species: P. marionae

Binomial name
- Prethopalpus marionae Baehr & Harvey, 2012

Species of spider

Prethopalpus marionae is a litter-dwelling goblin spider in the family Oonopidae.

== Distribution ==
This species in north-eastern Queensland and south-eastern Papua New Guinea.

== Description ==
The male is 1.09 mm, and the females 1.22 mm long.

== Etymology ==
This species is named in honour of Marion Morgan.
