= Prethopalpus maini =

Scientific classification
- Domain: Eukaryota
- Kingdom: Animalia
- Phylum: Arthropoda
- Subphylum: Chelicerata
- Class: Arachnida
- Order: Araneae
- Infraorder: Araneomorphae
- Family: Oonopidae
- Genus: Prethopalpus
- Species: P. maini

Binomial name
- Prethopalpus maini Baehr & Harvey, 2012

Species of spider

Prethopalpus maini is a subterranean goblin spider in the family Oonopidae.

== Distribution ==
This species is endemic to Western Australia. It occurs in caves and vuggy geology in the Pilbara.

== Description ==
The male and female 1.28 mm 1.16 mm.

== Etymology ==
This species is named in honour of Dean C. Main.
