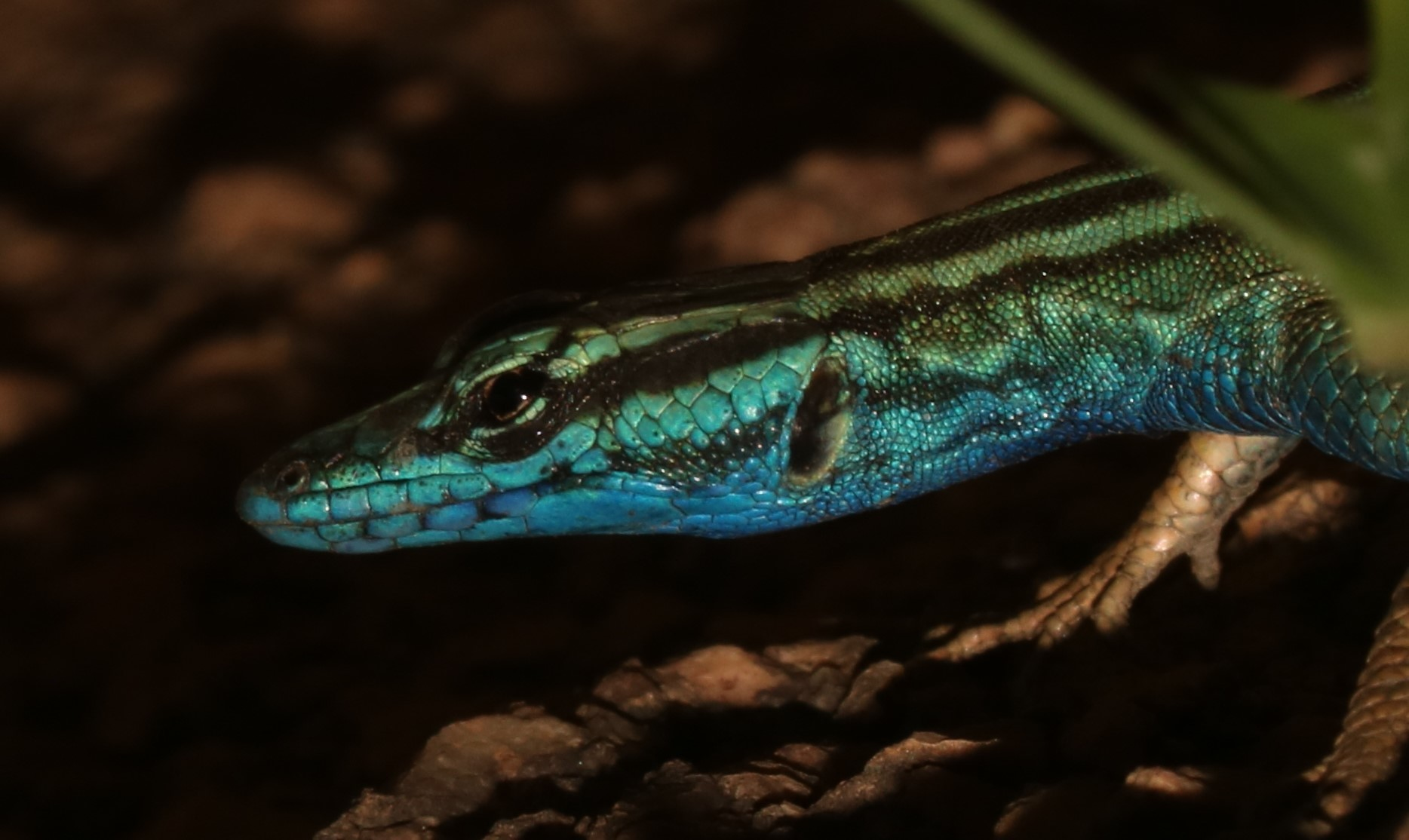

Conservation status
- Least Concern (IUCN 3.1)

Scientific classification
- Kingdom: Animalia
- Phylum: Chordata
- Class: Reptilia
- Order: Squamata
- Suborder: Scinciformata
- Infraorder: Scincomorpha
- Family: Cordylidae
- Genus: Platysaurus
- Species: P. attenboroughi

Binomial name
- Platysaurus attenboroughi Whiting, Branch, Pepper, & Keogh, 2015

= Platysaurus attenboroughi =

Attenborough's flat lizard

Species of lizard

Platysaurus attenboroughi (also known as Attenborough's flat lizard) is a species of lizard in the family Cordylidae. It is a small, spiny lizard found in Namibia and South Africa.

== See also ==
- List of things named after David Attenborough and his works
