= Orange-throated flat lizard =

Conservation status
- Near Threatened (IUCN 3.1)

Scientific classification
- Kingdom: Animalia
- Phylum: Chordata
- Class: Reptilia
- Order: Squamata
- Suborder: Scinciformata
- Infraorder: Scincomorpha
- Family: Cordylidae
- Genus: Platysaurus
- Species: P. monotropis

Binomial name
- Platysaurus monotropis Jacobsen, 1994

Species of lizard

The orange-throated flat lizard (Platysaurus monotropis) is a species of lizard in the Cordylidae family.

== Description ==
Orange-throated flat lizard females and juveniles are black-brown with white stripes. Males have orange heads, green-blue bodies, and a red tail. A black collar is present on the throat.

== Geography ==
Orange-throated flat lizards live in northern Transvaal in South Africa. They live in mesic savannahs with sandstone outcrops.
