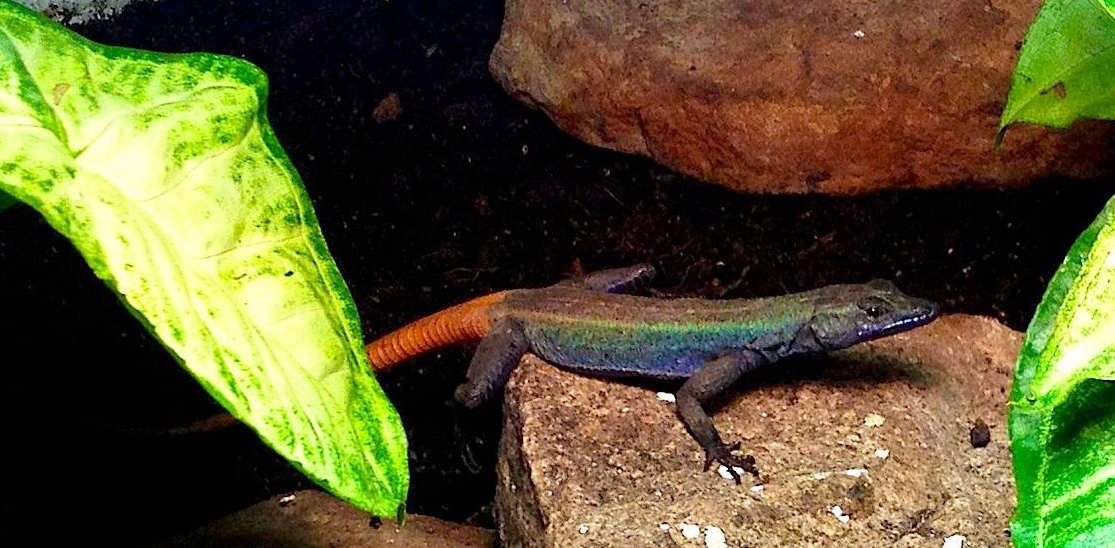

Conservation status
- Least Concern (IUCN 3.1)

Scientific classification
- Domain: Eukaryota
- Kingdom: Animalia
- Phylum: Chordata
- Class: Reptilia
- Order: Squamata
- Family: Cordylidae
- Genus: Platysaurus
- Species: P. torquatus

Binomial name
- Platysaurus torquatus Peters, 1879

= Platysaurus torquatus =

Species of lizard

Platysaurus torquatus, the striped flat lizard or collared flat lizard, is a species of lizard in the Cordylidae family found in southeast Africa.

== Description ==
Platysaurus torquatus is the only lizard in its genus which has adult males with white stripes on its back. Males, females, and juveniles all have black-brown backs with these thick white stripes. Females and juveniles have a blue tail, while adult males have an orange tail, as well as a collar.

== Habits ==
The diet includes beetles, ants, and caterpillars. They lay two eggs in December.

== Habitat and distribution ==
Platysaurus torquatus live in savanna habitats of Zimbabwe, Mozambique, and Malawi, often on flat outcrops near rivers.

== See also ==
- Platysaurus
- Cordylidae
