= Spotted flat lizard =

Conservation status
- Least Concern (IUCN 3.1)

Scientific classification
- Kingdom: Animalia
- Phylum: Chordata
- Class: Reptilia
- Order: Squamata
- Suborder: Scinciformata
- Infraorder: Scincomorpha
- Family: Cordylidae
- Genus: Platysaurus
- Species: P. maculatus

Binomial name
- Platysaurus maculatus Broadley, 1965

Species of lizard

The spotted flat lizard (Platysaurus maculatus) is a lizard in the Cordylidae family, which is native to Mozambique.

The spotted flat lizard has two subspecies, P. m. maculatus and P. m. linecauda. Both were described in 1965.

The species is known as the spotted flat lizard because they use narrow cracks in flat rocks to hide and retreat from predators.

== See also ==
- Platysaurus
- Cordylidae
