= Prethopalpus blosfeldsorum =

Scientific classification
- Domain: Eukaryota
- Kingdom: Animalia
- Phylum: Arthropoda
- Subphylum: Chelicerata
- Class: Arachnida
- Order: Araneae
- Infraorder: Araneomorphae
- Family: Oonopidae
- Genus: Prethopalpus
- Species: P. blosfeldsorum

Binomial name
- Prethopalpus blosfeldsorum Baehr & Harvey, 2012

Species of spider

Prethopalpus blosfeldsorum is a litter-dwelling goblin spider in the family Oonopidae.

== Distribution ==
This species is endemic to the Kroombit Tops region in Queensland.

== Description ==
The male is 1.05 mm, but females are unknown.

== Etymology ==
This species is named in honour of Bruno and Denise Blosfelds.
