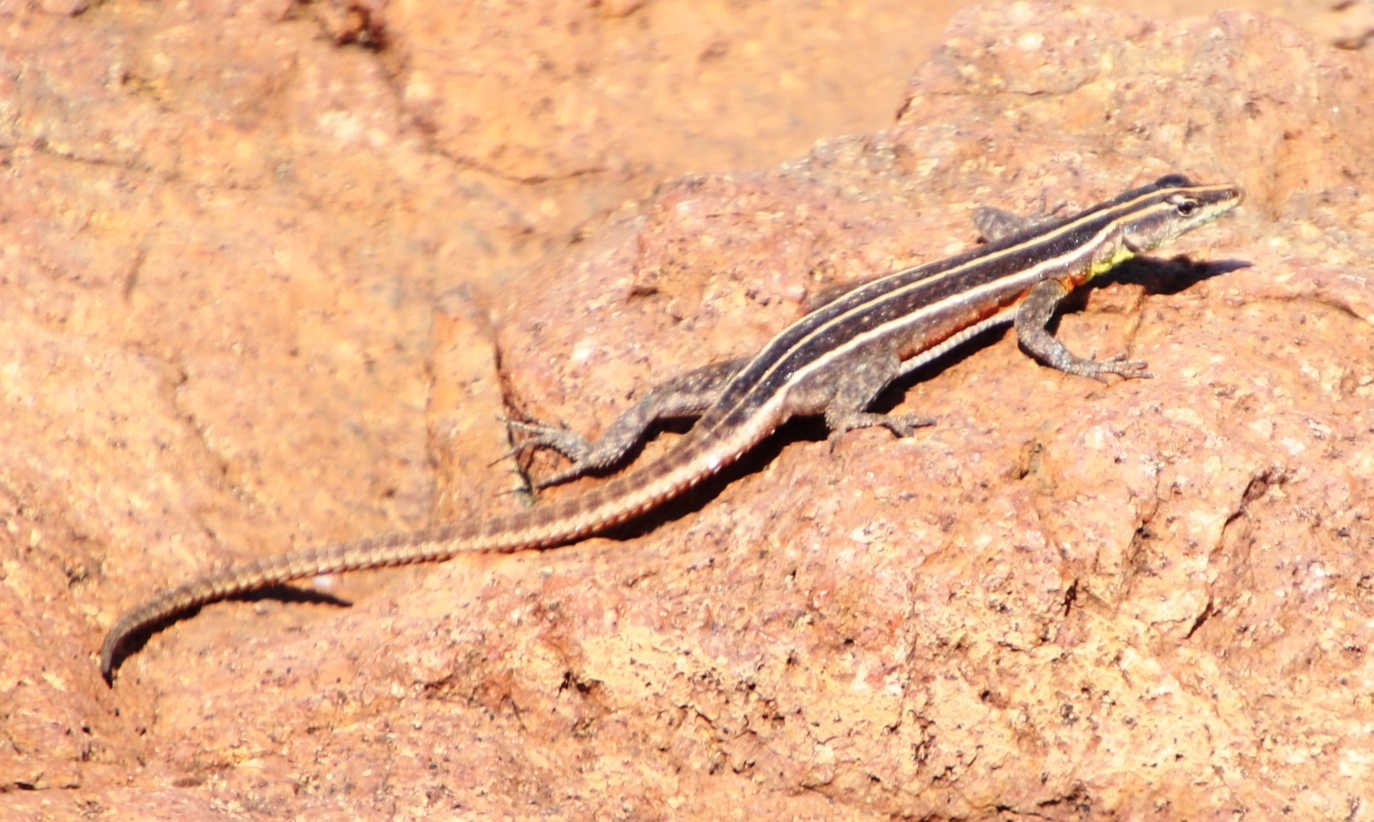

Conservation status
- Least Concern (IUCN 3.1)

Scientific classification
- Kingdom: Animalia
- Phylum: Chordata
- Class: Reptilia
- Order: Squamata
- Suborder: Scinciformata
- Infraorder: Scincomorpha
- Family: Cordylidae
- Genus: Platysaurus
- Species: P. lebomboensis

Binomial name
- Platysaurus lebomboensis Jacobsen, 1994

= Lebombo flat lizard =

Species of lizard

The Lebombo flat lizard (Platysaurus lebomboensis) is a species of lizard in the family Cordylidae.

== Geography ==
The Lebombo flat lizard lives in southern Africa, including Transvaal, Swaziland, and KwaZulu-Natal, a province in South Africa. This area includes Middle Lebombo Range.

The habitat of this small lizard include grasslands and thickets.

== Description ==
Lebombo flat lizards are closely related to a subspecies of Platysaurus intermedius, P. i. wilhelmi. Females, males, and juveniles of the Lebombo flat lizard are black-brown-gray, with blue bellies and white spots and stripes on their backs.
