= Prethopalpus attenboroughi =

Scientific classification
- Domain: Eukaryota
- Kingdom: Animalia
- Phylum: Arthropoda
- Subphylum: Chelicerata
- Class: Arachnida
- Order: Araneae
- Infraorder: Araneomorphae
- Family: Oonopidae
- Genus: Prethopalpus
- Species: P. attenboroughi

Binomial name
- Prethopalpus attenboroughi Baehr & Harvey, 2012

Species of spider

Prethopalpus attenboroughi, or Attenborough's goblin spider, is a tiny spider named after Sir David Attenborough, that is found only on Horn Island off northern Queensland in Australia. The millimeter-long spider was described in 2012 by Dr Barbara Baehr of the Queensland Museum and Professor Mark Harvey of the Western Australian Museum.

The male type specimen was collected in 1986; the female is unknown.

== See also ==
- List of things named after David Attenborough and his works
