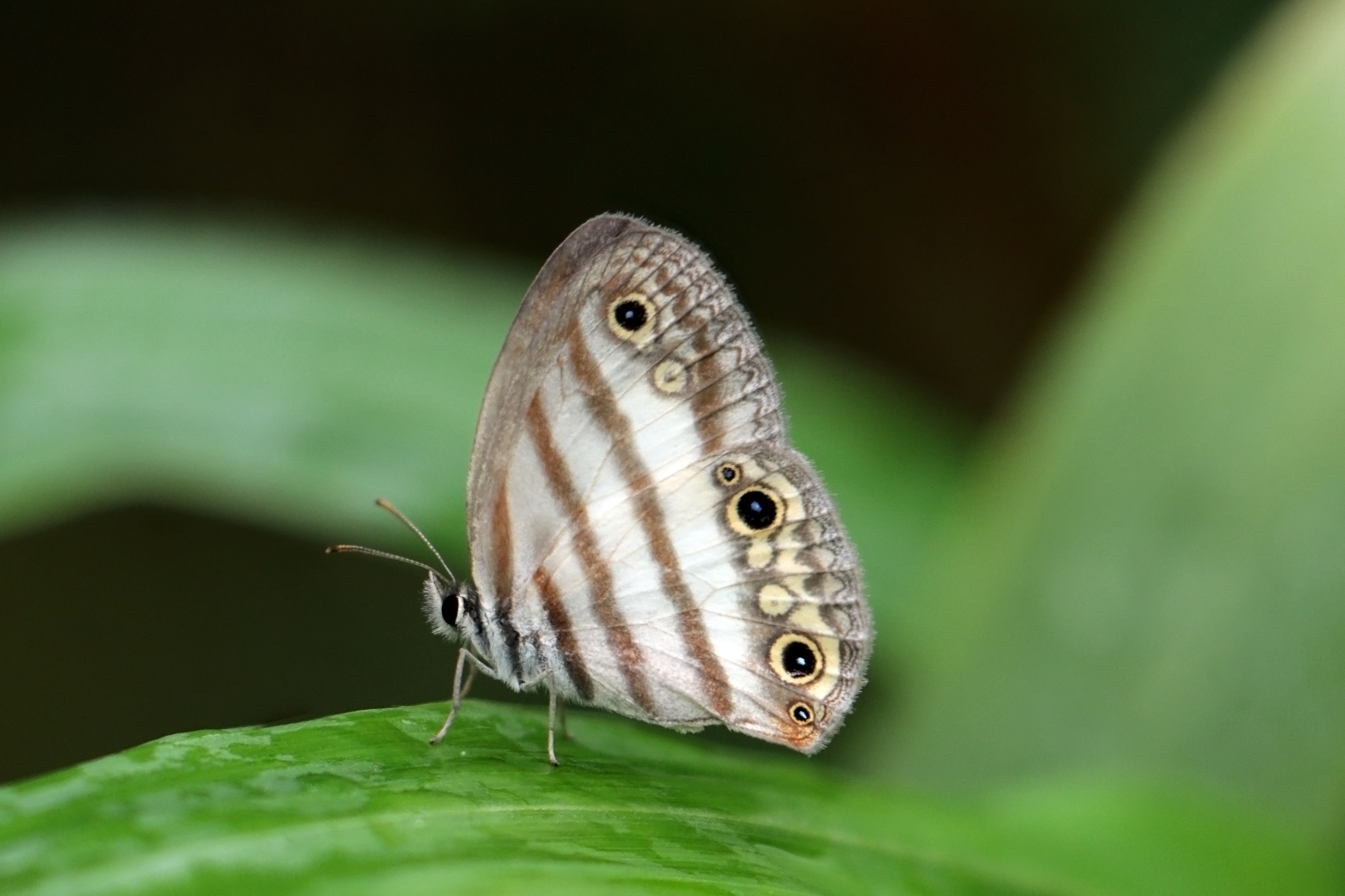
- Westwood's satyr (Euptychia westwoodi) in Panama

Scientific classification
- Kingdom: Animalia
- Phylum: Arthropoda
- Class: Insecta
- Order: Lepidoptera
- Family: Nymphalidae
- Subfamily: Satyrinae
- Tribe: Satyrini
- Subtribe: Euptychiina
- Genus: Euptychia; Hübner, 1818

= Euptychia =

Genus of butterflies

Euptychia is a genus of satyrid butterflies found in the Neotropical realm. The genus was erected by Jacob Hübner in 1818.

== Species ==
Listed alphabetically:

- Euptychia attenboroughi Neild, Nakahara, Fratello & Le Crom, 2015
- Euptychia cesarense Pulido, Andrade, Peña & Lamas, 2011
- Euptychia enyo Butler, 1867
- Euptychia ernestina Weymer, 1911
- Euptychia fetna Butler, 1870
- Euptychia hannemanni Forster, 1964
- Euptychia hilara (C. Felder & R. Felder, 1867)
- Euptychia insolata Butler & H. Druce, 1872
- Euptychia jesia Butler, 1869
- Euptychia marceli Brévignon, 2005
- Euptychia meta Weymer, 1911
- Euptychia mollina (Hübner, 1813)
- Euptychia neildi Brévignon, 2005
- Euptychia picea Butler, 1867
- Euptychia rubrofasciata L. Miller & J. Miller, 1988
- Euptychia rufocincta Weymer, 1911
- Euptychia sophiae Zacca, Nakahara, Dolibaina & Dias, 2015
- Euptychia westwoodi Butler, 1867
