= Prethopalpus =

Scientific classification
- Kingdom: Animalia
- Phylum: Arthropoda
- Subphylum: Chelicerata
- Class: Arachnida
- Order: Araneae
- Infraorder: Araneomorphae
- Family: Oonopidae
- Genus: Prethopalpus; Baehr, Harvey, Burger, and Thoma, 2012

Species
- P. alexanderi P. attenboroughi P. bali P. bellicosus P. blosfeldsorum P. boltoni P. brunei P. callani P. cooperi P. deelemanae P. eberhardi P. fosuma P. framenaui P. hainanensis P. humphreysi P. ilam P. infernalis P. java P. julianneae P. khasi P. kintyre P. kranzae P. kropfi P. leuser P. madurai P. magnaocularis P. mahanadi P. maini P. marionae P. meghalaya P. oneillae P. pahang P. pearsoni P. perak P. platnicki P. rawlinsoni P. sabah P. sarawak P. scanloni P. schwendingeri P. tropicus P. utara

Diversity
- 41 species

Genus of spiders

Prethopalpus is a spider genus known as goblin spiders and are found in the Australasian tropics, including Nepal, India, Indonesia, Papua New Guinea and Australia. Three species are widely distributed, whereas the majority of species are recorded a single localities. Of the 41 species, 14 blind troglobite species live in subterranean ecosystems in Western Australia.

== See also ==
- Prethopalpus attenboroughi Baehr & Harvey, 2012: Queensland, Torres Strait
- Prethopalpus maini Baehr & Harvey, 2012: Western Australia, Pilbara
