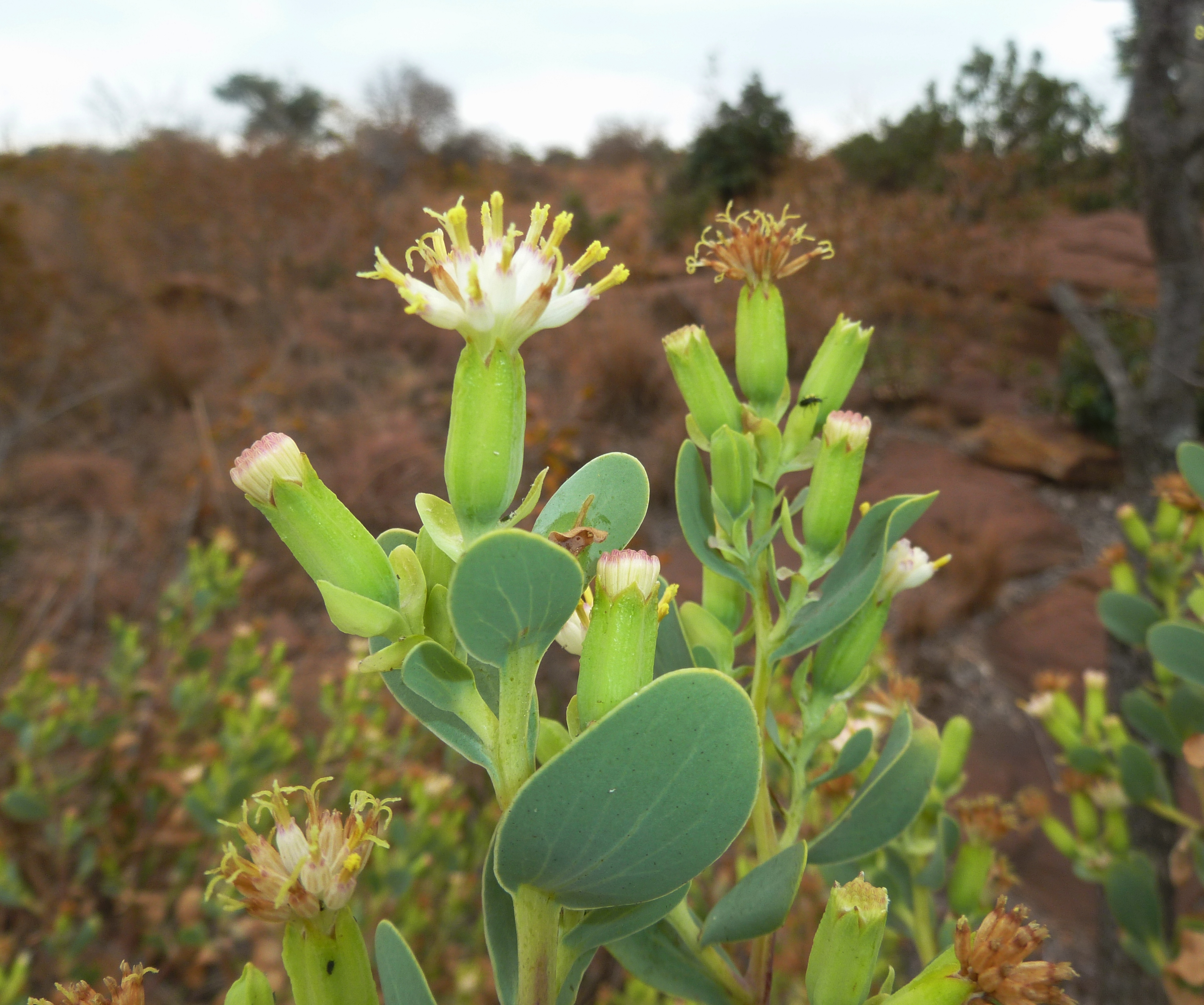
- Lopholaena coriifolia

Scientific classification
- Kingdom: Plantae
- Clade: Tracheophytes
- Clade: Angiosperms
- Clade: Eudicots
- Clade: Asterids
- Order: Asterales
- Family: Asteraceae
- Subfamily: Asteroideae
- Tribe: Senecioneae
- Genus: Lopholaena; DC.

= Lopholaena =

Genus of flowering plants

Lopholaena (from lophos, a crest, and chlaina, a cloak) is a genus of perennial shrubs and herbaceous plants in the family Asteraceae. About 20 species occur from tropical to southern Africa.

== Description ==
The flower head is homogamous, having only disc florets, that grow from a flat, honeycombed receptacle. The flowers have 5 triangular lobes, and their corollas vary from white to light purple. The pappus consists of 2 to 3 series of slender bristles. One series of phyllaries fringe the flower head, which are fused at the base. The flower heads may be clustered or paniculate. The alternate leaves are nearly sessile and may clasp the stem (i.e. amplexicaul).

Species

- Lopholaena acutifolia R.E.Fr.
- Lopholaena alata P.A.Duvign.
- Lopholaena cneorifolia (DC.) S. Moore
- Lopholaena coriifolia (Sond.) Phill. & C.A.Sm.
- Lopholaena dehniae Merxm.
- Lopholaena deltombei P.A.Duvign.
- Lopholaena disticha (N. E. Br.) S. Moore
- Lopholaena dolichopappa (O. Hoffm.) S. Moore
- Lopholaena dregeana DC.
- Lopholaena festiva Brusse
- Lopholaena longipes (Harv.) Thell.
- Lopholaena phyllodes (Hiern) S.Moore
- Lopholaena platyphylla Benth.
- Lopholaena segmentata (Oliv.) S. Moore
- Lopholaena trianthema (O. Hoffm.) B.L. Burtt
- Lopholaena ussanguensis (O. Hoffm.) S. Moore
