= Mitchell's flat lizard =

Conservation status
- Least Concern (IUCN 3.1)

Scientific classification
- Kingdom: Animalia
- Phylum: Chordata
- Class: Reptilia
- Order: Squamata
- Family: Cordylidae
- Genus: Platysaurus
- Species: P. mitchelli

Binomial name
- Platysaurus mitchelli Loveridge, 1953

Species of lizard

Mitchell's flat lizard (Platysaurus mitchelli) is a species of lizard in the family Cordylidae. The species is native to Southeast Africa.

== Etymology ==
The specific name, mitchelli, is in honor of naturalist Bernard Lindley Mitchell of the Department of Game, Fish, and Tsetse Control in Nyasaland (now Malawi) in the 1940s.

== Geographic range ==
Platysaurus mitchelli is found in Malawi and Mozambique.

== Habitat ==
The preferred natural habitat of Platysaurus mitchelli is rocky areas, in both forest and grassland, at elevations of 700–2,800 m (2,300–9,200 ft).

== Behavior ==
Platysaurus mitchelli shelters in cracks and crevices of rocks, emerging to forage.

== Reproduction ==
Platysaurus mitchelli is oviparous.
