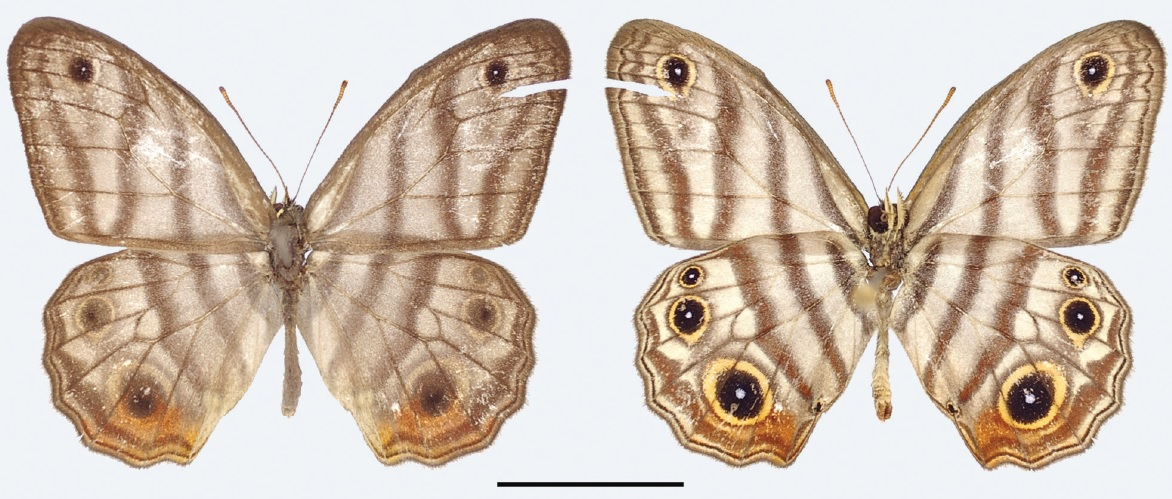
- Male dorsal (left) and ventral (right)
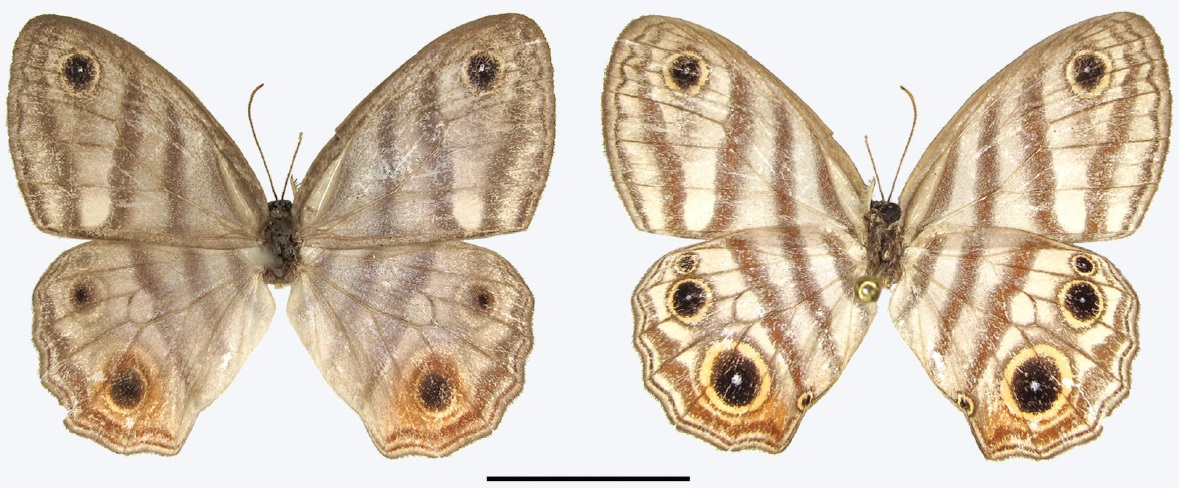
- Female dorsal (left) and ventral (right)

Scientific classification
- Kingdom: Animalia
- Phylum: Arthropoda
- Class: Insecta
- Order: Lepidoptera
- Family: Nymphalidae
- Genus: Euptychia
- Species: E. attenboroughi

Binomial name
- Euptychia attenboroughi Neild, Nakahara, Fratello & Le Crom, 2015

= Euptychia attenboroughi =

Species of butterfly

Euptychia attenboroughi or Attenborough's black-eyed satyr is a species of butterfly in the family Nymphalidae. Six specimens have been collected from the north-western part of the upper Amazon basin in Brazil, Venezuela and Colombia. The habitat consists of tropical evergreen forests.

The length of the forewings is 17–18 mm for males and 16–17 mm for females.

== Etymology ==
The species is named in honour of English naturalist, author and TV presenter, Sir David Attenborough, ″in gratitude for opening the eyes and hearts of millions to the natural world through his inspiring and edifying work″.

== See also ==
- List of things named after David Attenborough and his works
