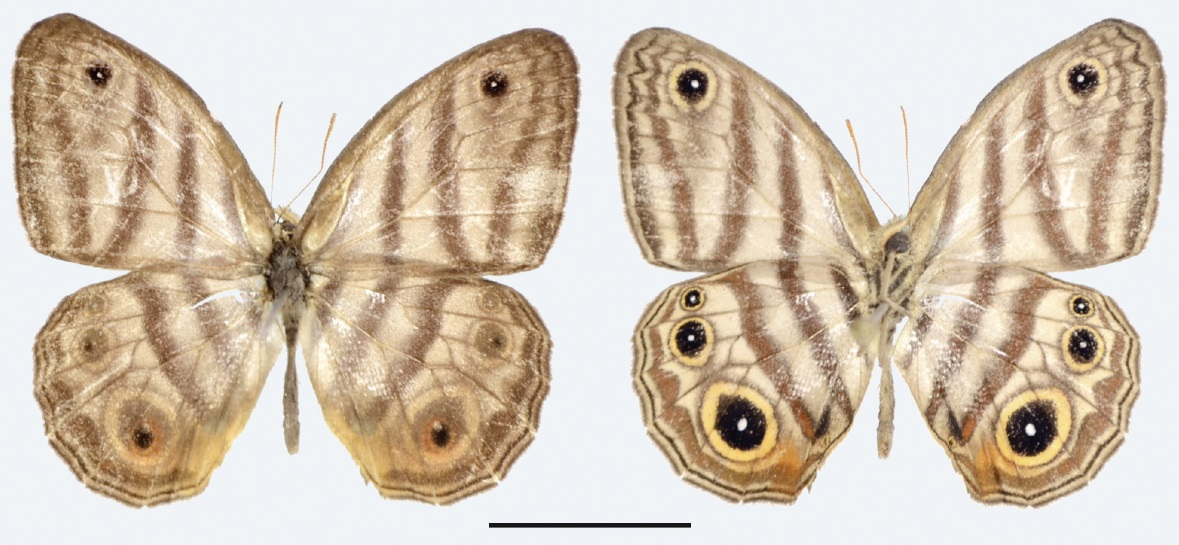
- Male dorsal (left) and ventral (right)

Scientific classification
- Kingdom: Animalia
- Phylum: Arthropoda
- Class: Insecta
- Order: Lepidoptera
- Family: Nymphalidae
- Genus: Euptychia
- Species: E. sophiae

Binomial name
- Euptychia sophiae Zacca, Nakahara, Dolibaina & Dias, 2015

= Euptychia sophiae =

Species of butterfly

Euptychia sophiae is a species of butterfly in the family Nymphalidae. It is found in western Brazil and in the neighbouring department of Loreto in north-eastern Peru. The habitat consists of submontane dense ombrophilous (very wet) forests.

The length of the forewings is 18–19 mm.

== Etymology ==
The species is named in honour of Thamara Zacca's niece, Laura Sophia.
