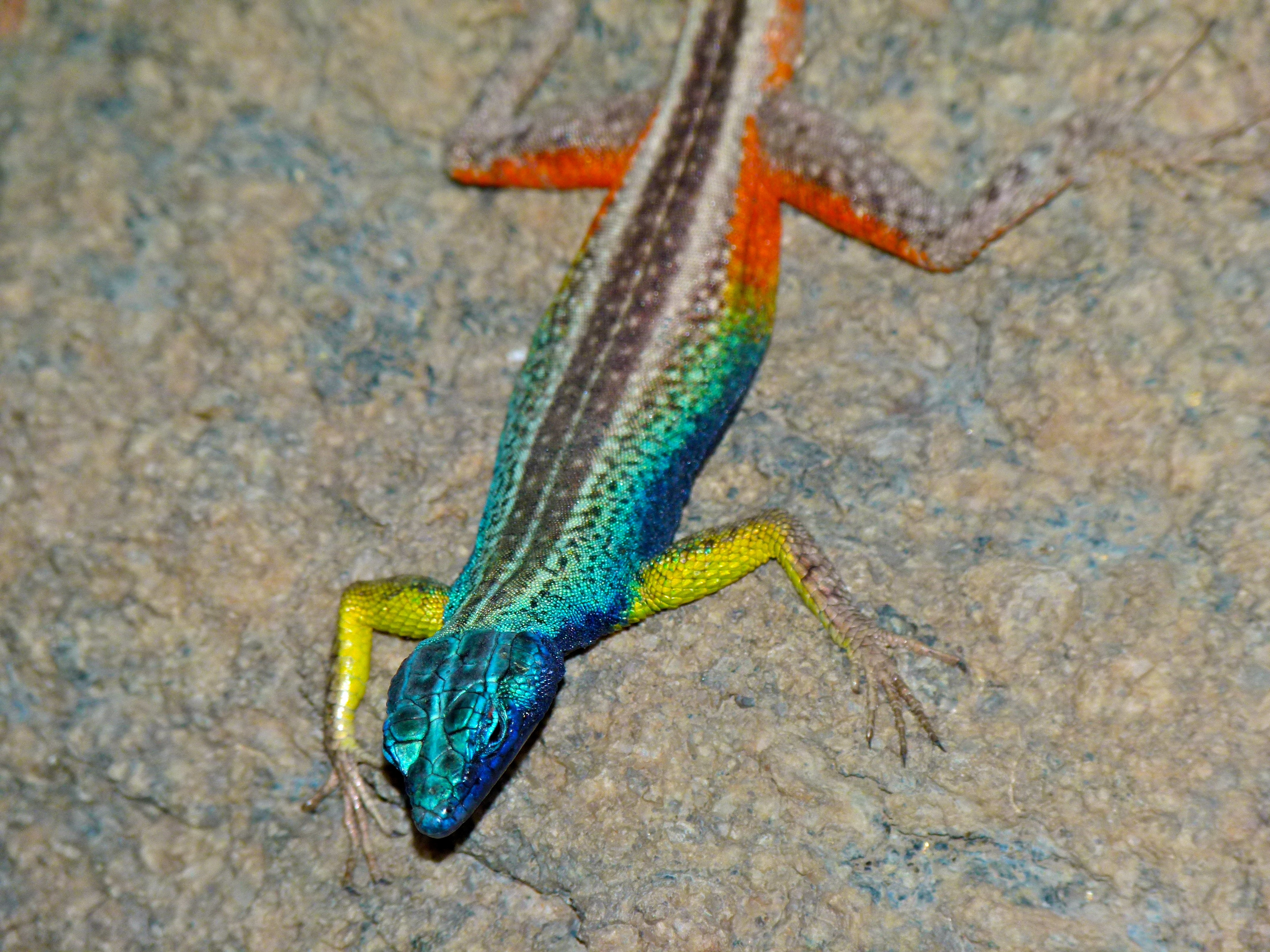
- Male colouration at Augrabies Falls National Park

Conservation status
- Least Concern (IUCN 3.1)

Scientific classification
- Kingdom: Animalia
- Phylum: Chordata
- Class: Reptilia
- Order: Squamata
- Family: Cordylidae
- Genus: Platysaurus
- Species: P. broadleyi

Binomial name
- Platysaurus broadleyi Branch & Whiting, 1997
- IUCN distribution of the Augrabies flat lizard Extant (resident)

= Broadley's flat lizard =

Platysaurus broadleyi

Species of lizard

Platysaurus broadleyi, known commonly as the Augrabies flat lizard, is a species of lizard in the family Cordylidae. The species is endemic to South Africa.

== Etymology ==
The specific name, broadleyi is in honour of African herpetologist Donald George Broadley. The original species description by Branch and Whiting (1997) makes it clear that the correct common name is the Augrabies flat lizard. It is sometimes incorrectly referred to as Broadley's flat lizard because the specific epithet is broadleyi.

== Geographic range ==
The Augrabies flat lizard has its geographic range for 200 km centred on Augrabies Falls, and west to Pella in the Northern Cape, South Africa. This area includes river valleys along the lower Orange River, Northern Cape Province, and Gordonia District.

== Habitat ==
The preferred natural habitat of P. broadleyi is rocky areas in both savanna and shrubland, at altitudes of 610–730 m (2,000–2,400 ft).

== Description ==
P. broadleyi females and juveniles have a dark brown back, with three thick, cream stripes on the back. These stripes may be broken up into spots, or have spots in between the stripes. The belly is white, sometimes with a black dot on it, and at the rear there is an orange colour. The tail is straw-coloured. Adult males have a bluish head and a greenish back. A darker area in the middle and the vestiges of the juvenile stripes and spots are also present. The forelimbs are yellow to orange, the throat is dark blue, and the belly is black in the front but becomes orange near the tail. Above the tail, it is a tan colour, while below and on the sides, it is orange. All this colouration, while helping to attract females, also has a downside: predators such as kestrels easily spot them. Females, on the other hand, have much more subdued colouration and are less likely to be eaten. The Augrabies flat lizard is very similar to Platysaurus capensis, or the Cape flat lizard, in scalation, but differs in having finer scalation on top of the forelimbs.

Medium-sized for its genus, P. broadleyi may attain a snout-to-vent length (SVL) of 8.4 cm (3.3 in).

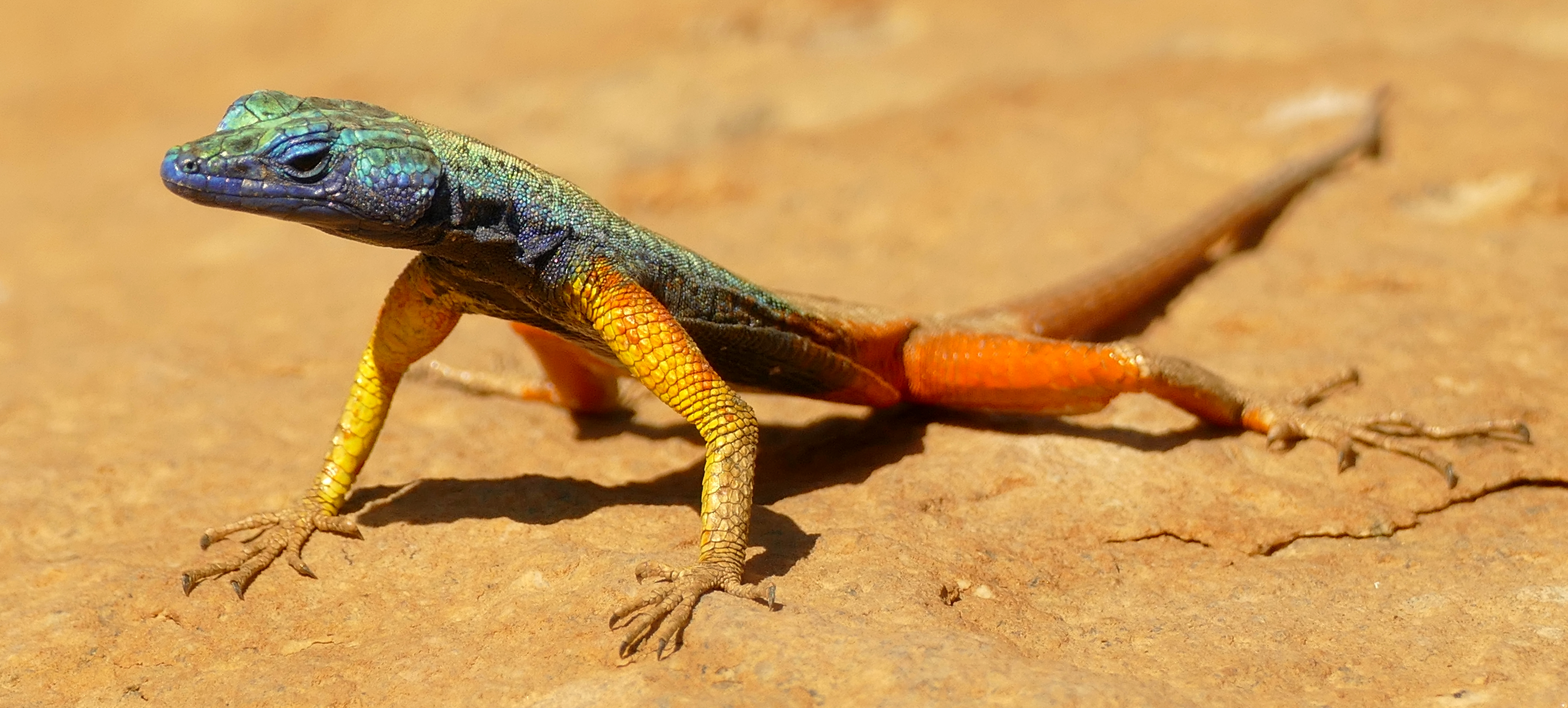

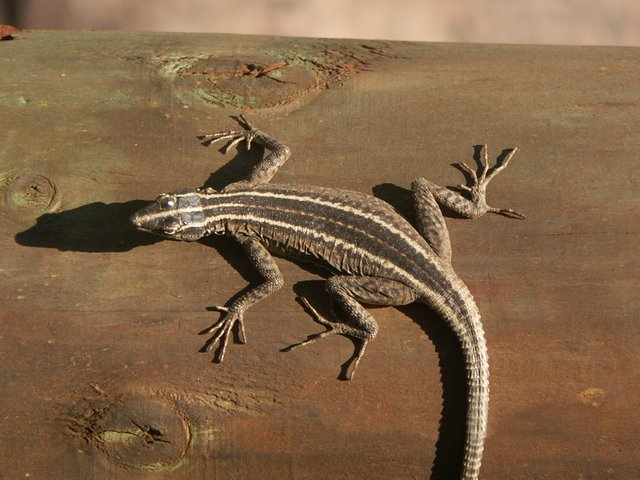
Female

== Habits ==
Augrabies flat lizards are common on the granite walls of Augrabies Falls National Park, where they are exposed to thousands of tourists. In summer, they perform acrobatic leaps to catch black flies on the wing from the swarms that gather near rivers, but they will also eat ripe berries of Namaqua figs. Augrabies flat lizards will follow bird flocks to find these fruit-laden trees. One major predator of this lizard is the rock kestrel. Research indicates that the higher the UV levels on a male's throat, the more dominant it is and is less likely to be challenged. These flat lizards have been discovered to have a much higher visual sensitivity to UV light than other lizards species, allowing males to accurately distinguish between conspecifics of various fitness. They have as many as three times the number of UV photoreceptor cells in their retina compared to other lizards.

== Breeding ==
Sexual maturity in P. broadleyi is reached at around 64 mm (2.5 in) snout-vent length for both sexes. Females lay two clutches of eggs in early summer. Males demonstrate a preference for larger female mates, most likely due to the positive correlation between the size of a female and the eggs she produces.

== See also ==
- Platysaurus
