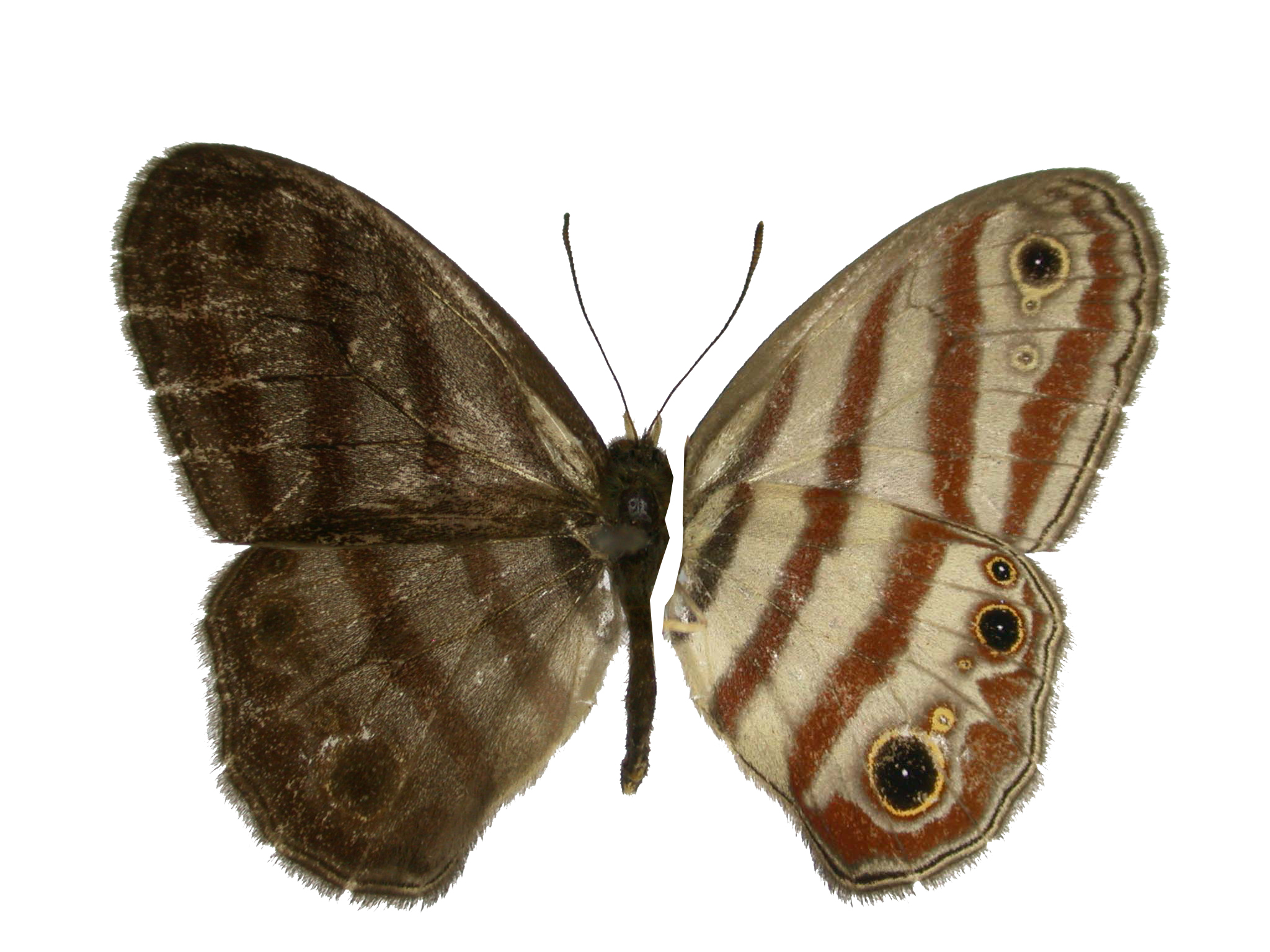

Scientific classification
- Kingdom: Animalia
- Phylum: Arthropoda
- Class: Insecta
- Order: Lepidoptera
- Family: Nymphalidae
- Genus: Euptychia
- Species: E. picea

Binomial name
- Euptychia picea Butler, 1867

= Euptychia picea =

Species of butterfly

Euptychia picea is a species of butterfly in the family Nymphalidae. It is found in Brazil (Amazonas), Peru and Suriname.
