= Blouberg (range) =

Mountain range in Limpopo, South Africa

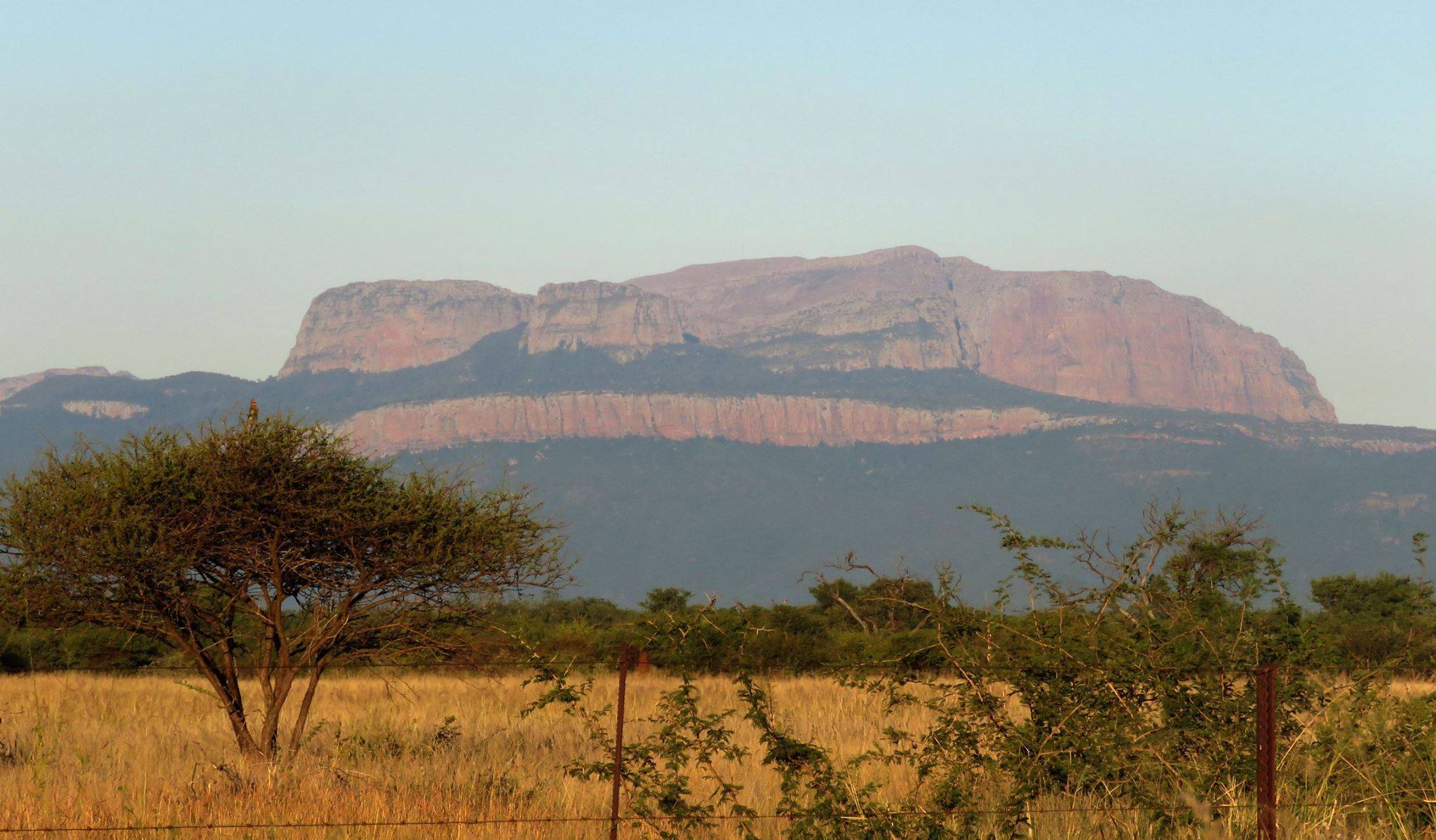

Highest point
- Elevation: 2,040 m (6,690 ft)
- Listing: List of mountain ranges of South Africa
- Coordinates: 23°05′0″S 28°51′0″E

Dimensions
- Length: 36 km (22 mi) E/W
- Width: 10 km (6.2 mi) N/S

Geography
- Location within South Africa
- Country: South Africa
- Province: Limpopo
- Parent range: Soutpansberg

Geology
- Orogeny: Kaapvaal craton
- Rock age: Neoarchean to early Paleoproterozoic
- Rock type(s): Bushveld igneous complex, sandstone

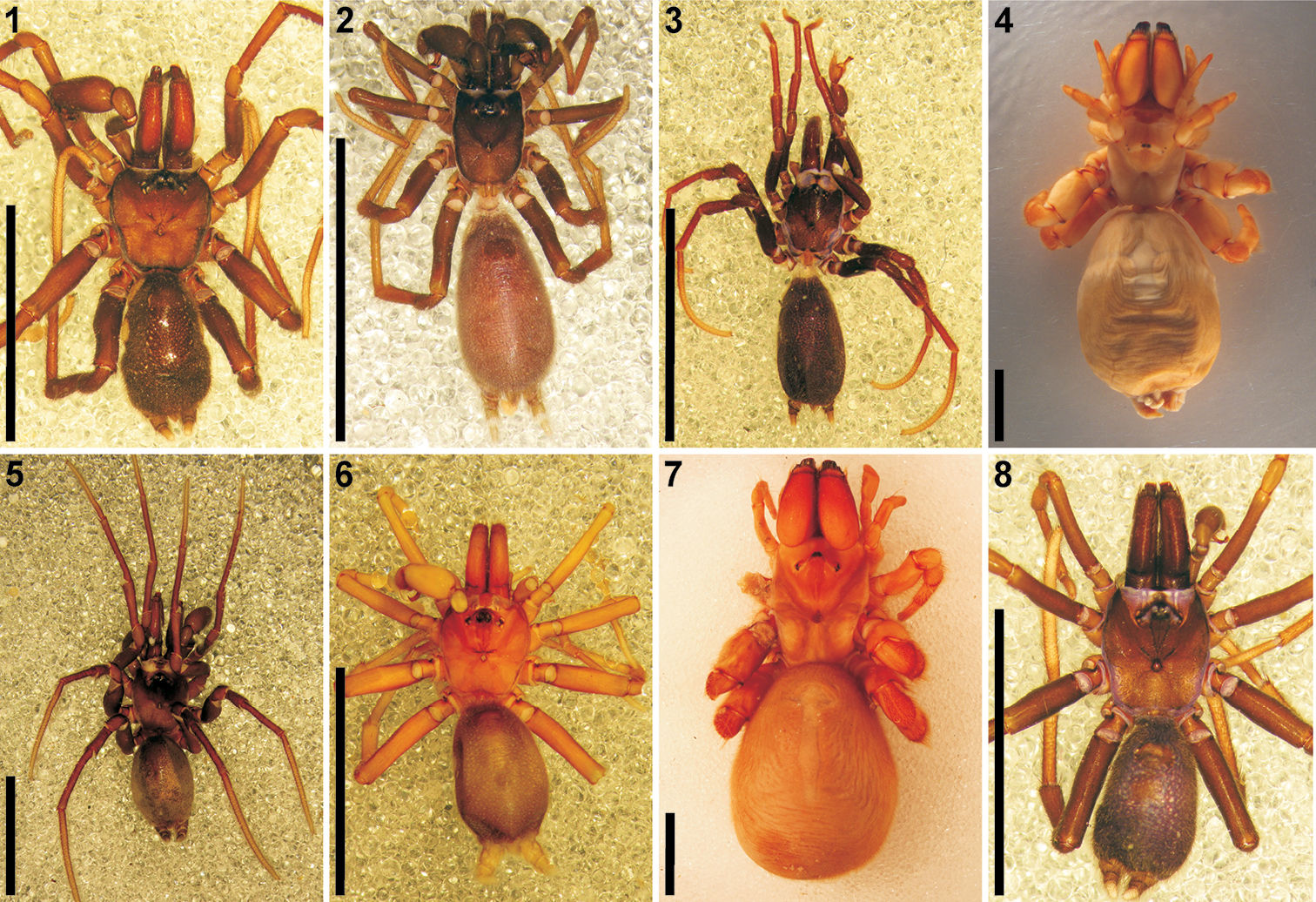
The Blouberg is known for the high endemism of its invertebrates. Number 7 is a specimen of Calommata transvaalica, a spider from the Blouberg

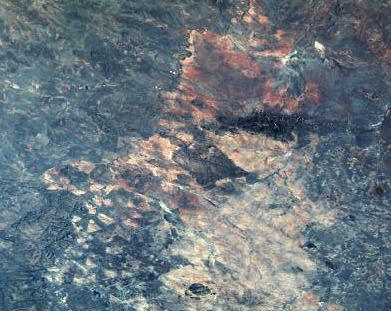
NASA picture of the Blouberg (dark shape, middle right) and the pale Makgabeng Plateau directly to the south of it

The Blouberg (formerly "Blaauwberg"), meaning "Blue Mountain" in Dutch, is a range of mountains in the Limpopo Province, at the far north of South Africa. It is located in Blouberg Local Municipality, Capricorn District. The mountain is entrenched in the history of the local Northern Sotho people, and they have different names for its various parts.

The Blouberg forms part of the 'Vhembe Biosphere Reserve', named a biosphere reserve by UNESCO since 2009. This reserve also includes the neighboring Makgabeng Plateau, the Soutpansberg, the northern part of the Kruger National Park, the Makuleke Wetlands and the Mapungubwe Cultural Landscape. The eastern and part of the central Blouberg prominences are enclosed and protected as part of the Blouberg Nature Reserve. A 4x4 track traverses Rapanyan's Neck, the defile that separates these easterly subranges.

== Setting ==
This rocky mountain range rises over a plateau averaging 900 m to the west of the western end of the Soutpansberg range. The Blouberg is topped by massive rocky outcrops resembling castles or fortifications with sheer walls. Its highest point reaches 2,040 m above sea level and is also the highest point of the entire Soutpansberg/Blouberg system. The Brak River (also known as Hout River), a tributary of the Sand River, flows diagonally along the southeastern edge of the Blouberg, separating it from the Soutpansberg further east. Although these two ranges are clearly destinguishable from a geographical point of view, geologically the Blouberg forms part of the Soutpansberg.

== Human population ==
About 117 settlements in its foothills are home to some 161,000 inhabitants, belonging to the Bahananwa nation. Senwabarwana, the economic centre of these villages, is visited by many to do their shopping. During the 19th century they were incorporated into the South African Republic, and the homeland system was introduced during the Apartheid era of the 20th century. Basic infrastructure and developmental needs were neglected, and in the 21st century it remains one of Limpopo's most underdeveloped regions. Many villages experience high unemployment rates, severe poverty or low levels of income despite the area's natural resources. Their isolation is mitigated by their sense of community and connectivity to each other.

== Ecology ==
The vegetation of the Blouberg ranges from sub-tropical veld or savanna at the base, to a type of Afro-montane vegetation related to the Cape Fynbos near the summits. The rocky cliffs are a haven for birds of prey such as the Cape vultures.

The Blouberg, like its larger neighbor further east, the Soutpansberg, is known for a high level of endemism of its invertebrate fauna, such as the Swanepoel's widow butterfly that is found on the southern slopes of the range. The Waterberg flat lizard and a subspecies of the common flat lizard are found in this range.

== Rock climbing ==
The Blouberg is one of the most spectacular rock climbing areas in South Africa. As a rock climbing destination it is famous for its sheer 350 m "Moonshadow" wall. Most of the climbing spots are on private land but climbers can make arrangements to access them through the Alldays Mountain Club in nearby Alldays, Limpopo.

== See also ==
- List of mountain ranges of South Africa
