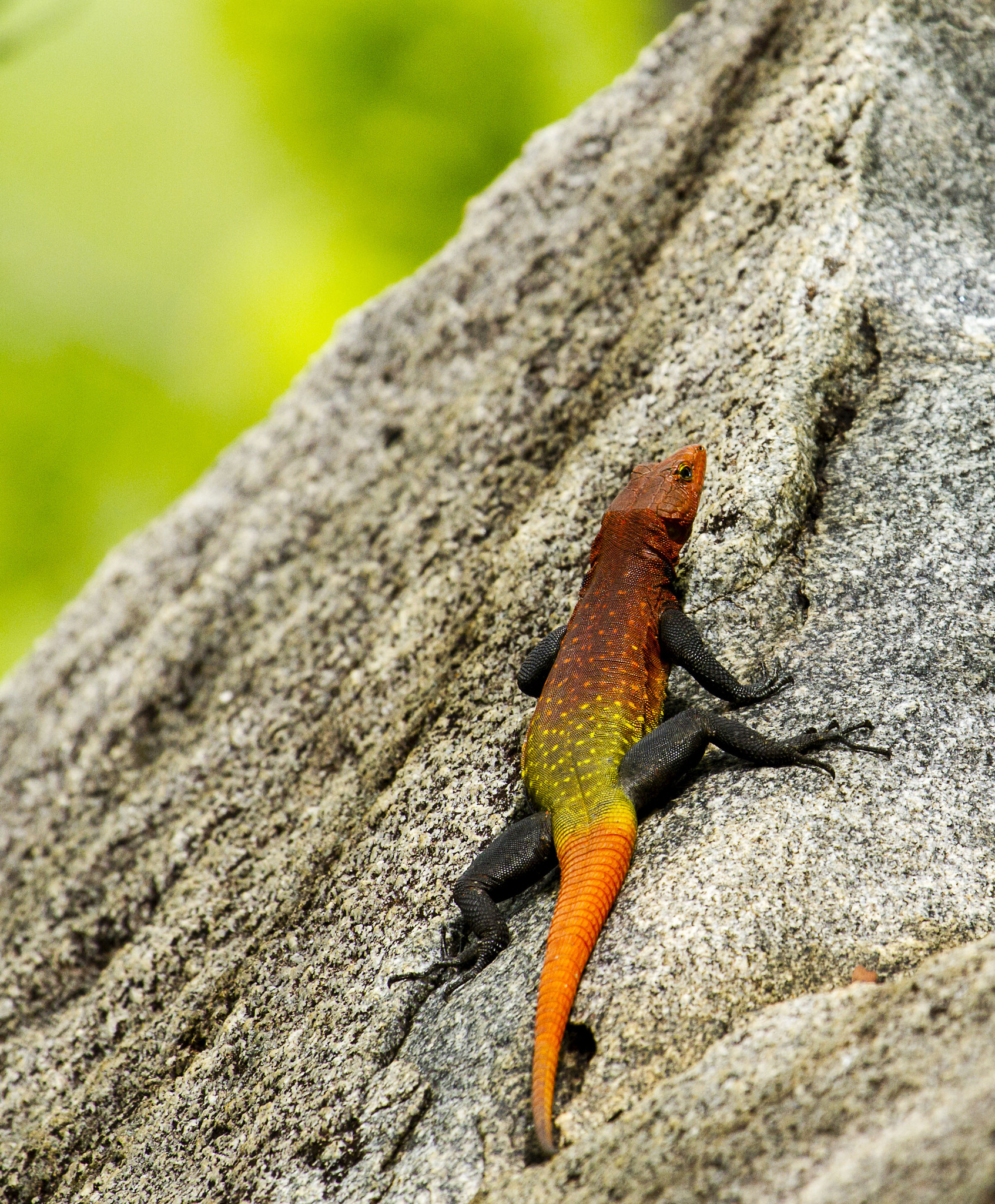
- Platysaurus imperator

Scientific classification
- Kingdom: Animalia
- Phylum: Chordata
- Class: Reptilia
- Order: Squamata
- Family: Cordylidae
- Genus: Platysaurus; A. Smith, 1844

= Platysaurus =

Genus of lizards

Platysaurus is a genus of lizards, commonly known as flat lizards for their flat backs, in the family Cordylidae.

== Geographic range ==
All species in the genus Platysaurus live in isolated populations in southern Africa. They are found in Mozambique, Zimbabwe, eastern Botswana, southern Namibia and northern and western South Africa.

== Description ==
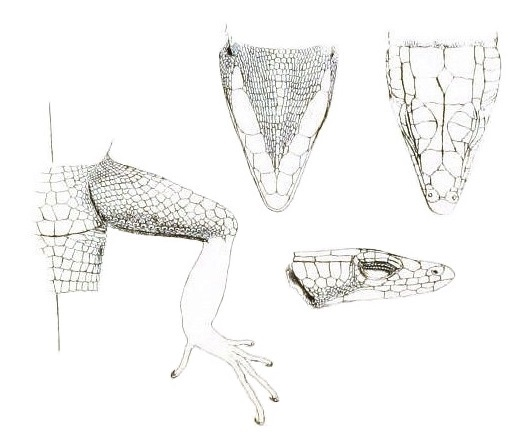
P. capensis, views of head and hind limb

The species of Platysaurus exhibit sexual dimorphism. Females and juveniles often have black or brown backs with white stripes, while males are much more colored. Also, males are somewhat larger than females.

== Species ==
The following 16 described species are recognized as being valid.

- Platysaurus attenboroughi Whiting, Branch, Pepper & Keogh, 2015 – Attenborough's flat lizard
- Platysaurus broadleyi Branch & Whiting, 1997 – Broadley's flat lizard or Augrabies flat lizard
- Platysaurus capensis A. Smith, 1844 – Cape flat lizard
- Platysaurus guttatus A. Smith, 1849 – dwarf flat lizard
- Platysaurus imperator Broadley, 1962 – emperor flat lizard
- Platysaurus intermedius Matschie, 1891 – common flat lizard
- Platysaurus lebomboensis Jacobsen, 1994 – Lebombo flat lizard
- Platysaurus maculatus Broadley, 1965 – spotted flat lizard
- Platysaurus minor V. FitzSimons, 1930 – Waterberg flat lizard
- Platysaurus mitchelli Loveridge, 1953 – Mitchell's flat lizard
- Platysaurus monotropis Jacobsen, 1994 – orange-throated flat lizard
- Platysaurus ocellatus Broadley, 1962 – ocellated flat lizard
- Platysaurus orientalis V. FitzSimons, 1941 – Sekukune flat lizard
- Platysaurus pungweensis Broadley, 1959 – Pungwe flat lizard
- Platysaurus relictus Broadley, 1976 – Soutpansberg flat lizard
- Platysaurus torquatus W. Peters, 1879 – striped flat lizard

== See also ==
- Cordylidae
- Pseudocordylus
- Cordylus
