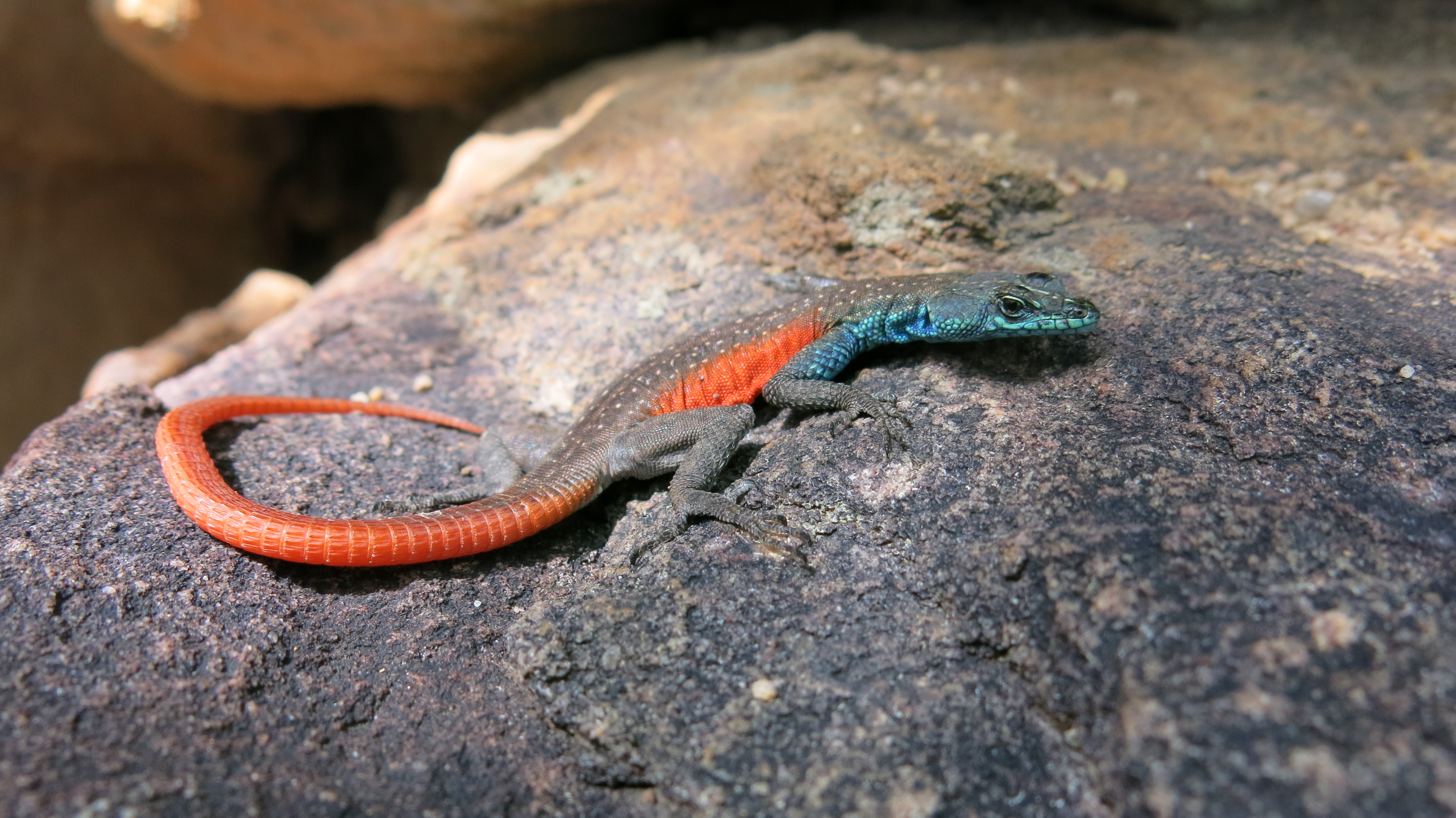
- Male Waterberg flat lizard, Masebe, South Africa

Conservation status
- Least Concern (IUCN 3.1)

Scientific classification
- Kingdom: Animalia
- Phylum: Chordata
- Class: Reptilia
- Order: Squamata
- Suborder: Scinciformata
- Infraorder: Scincomorpha
- Family: Cordylidae
- Genus: Platysaurus
- Species: P. minor

Binomial name
- Platysaurus minor FitzSimons, 1930

= Waterberg flat lizard =

Species of lizard

The Waterberg flat lizard (Platysaurus minor) is a species of lizard in the family Cordylidae. It is endemic to South Africa.

== Geography ==
The Waterberg flat lizard ranges from Waterberg, South Africa, to the foothills of the Blouberg. The Waterberg flat lizard lives in rocky sandstone outcrops in a savannah habitat.

== Habits ==
The Waterberg flat lizard eats mainly insects, but will sometimes eat plants. It lives in small family groups and breeds in summer, when two eggs are produced.

== Description ==
The Waterberg flat lizard is 60–70 mm long. The scales on the sides of its body are rounded, raised and larger than those on its back. Three longitudinal stripes are always entire on females, but sometimes divided in males.
