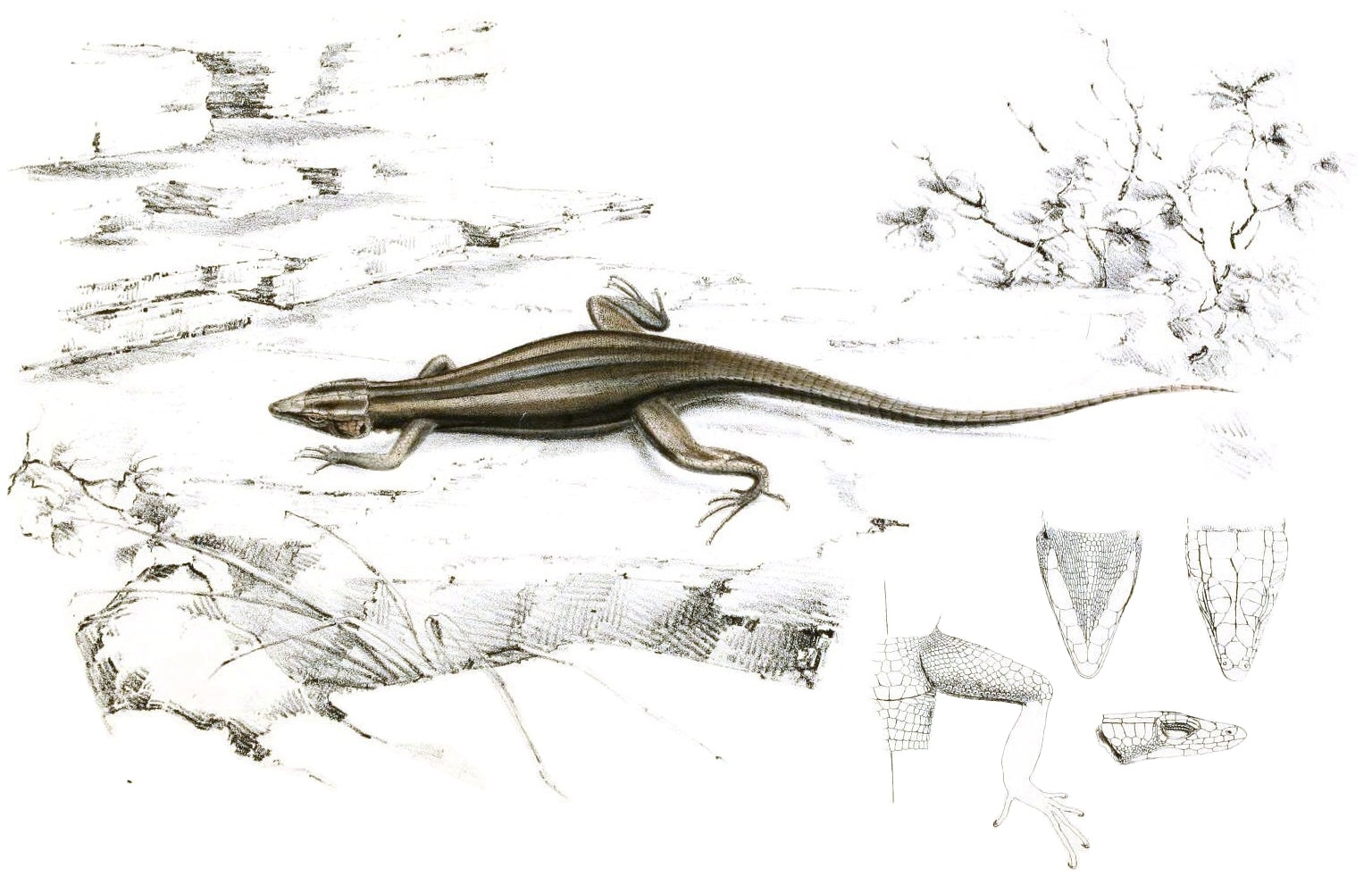
- Illustration of female

Conservation status
- Least Concern (IUCN 3.1)

Scientific classification
- Kingdom: Animalia
- Phylum: Chordata
- Class: Reptilia
- Order: Squamata
- Suborder: Scinciformata
- Infraorder: Scincomorpha
- Family: Cordylidae
- Genus: Platysaurus
- Species: P. capensis

Binomial name
- Platysaurus capensis A. Smith, 1844

= Cape flat lizard =

Species of lizard

The Cape flat lizard or Namaqua flat lizard (Platysaurus capensis) is a lizard in the Cordylidae family found in Namibia and South Africa.

== Description ==
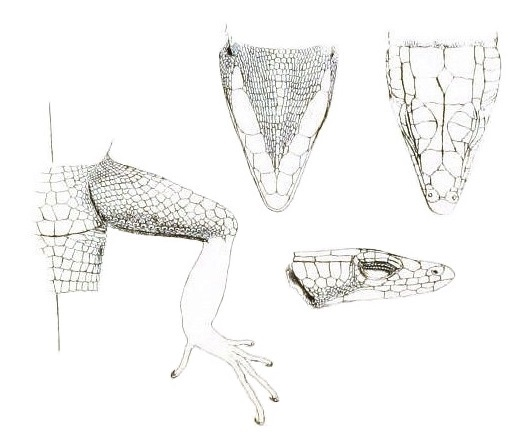
Views of head and hind limb

Females and juveniles have a dark brown back with three wide white stripes which run down head to tail. Their bellies are white with a black blotch in the center. Adult males, on the other hand, have the upper half of their body bright blue, sometimes with pale spots or stripes. The back half, including the tail, is dark red. Adults are 5 to 6.6 inches long.

== Geography ==
This lizard lives in the southwestern part of Africa, in Namibia and South Africa. The Cape flat lizard lives in deserts with many rocks.

== Habits ==
Cape flat lizards hunt by ambush, waiting under a shady spot for an insect to pass by. It will also eat flowers and berries. Cape flat lizards are shy and often run for cover when threatened. People often see these lizards from a distance on top of rocks. They may live in small groups. Cape flat lizards lay their eggs in November or December.

== See also ==
- Platysaurus
- Cordylidae
