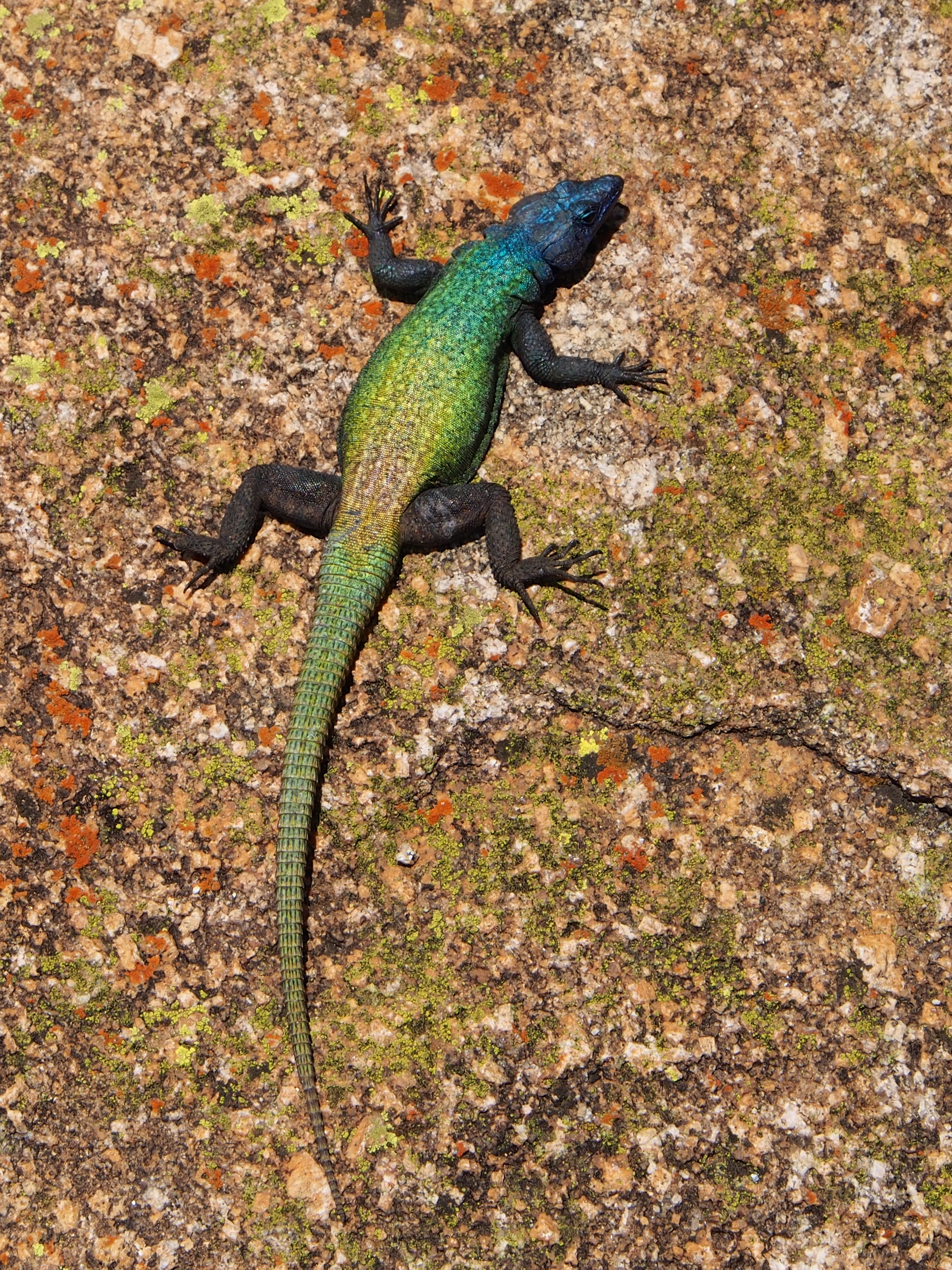
- Common flat lizard at Hwange National Park, Zimbabwe

Conservation status
- Least Concern (IUCN 3.1)

Scientific classification
- Domain: Eukaryota
- Kingdom: Animalia
- Phylum: Chordata
- Class: Reptilia
- Order: Squamata
- Family: Cordylidae
- Genus: Platysaurus
- Species: P. intermedius

Binomial name
- Platysaurus intermedius Matschie, 1891

= Common flat lizard =

Species of lizard

The common flat lizard (Platysaurus intermedius) is a species of lizard in the Cordylidae family. This lizard has 9 subspecies, all living in southern Africa.

== Description ==
The females and juveniles of all subspecies of P. intermedius have black scales, with white stripes on their backs. The bellies are brown, but the outer edges are white. Adult males have different colorations for each subspecies.

== Geography ==
Common flat lizards are the most widely distributed and common Platysaurus. These lizards live under exfoliating, or weathering, rocks. Their preferred types of rock are granite, sandstone, and quartzite. These lizards can be found in moderately moist savannahs, as well as rock outcrops. It ranges throughout Zimbabwe, North Province, Mpumalanga, southern Malawi, eastern Botswana, Swaziland, Mozambique, and northern KwaZulu-Natal. This area includes the Kalahari Desert, and several large river drainage systems.

== Subspecies ==
Nine subspecies are recognized:

=== P. i. wilhelmi ===
Males of P. i. whilhelmi are green or brown on their backs. White spots are also present. Their tails begin red and change to yellow at the ends. Their bellies are mostly blue, but the centers are black. This subspecies can be found in southern Mpumalanga, a province of South Africa. P. i. wilhelmi may not be a subspecies of Platysaurus intermedius, as it possibly is closer to the Lebombo flat lizard, Platysaurus lebomboensis. Males have been found to run shorter distances and go into hiding from a predator earlier than females.

=== P. i. rhodesianus ===
P.i.rhodesianus is one of the largest subspecies of the common flat lizard, reaching 120 mm in length. A male can either have a blue-green or a yellow-green head. The head also has three white stripes. The back color is dependent on range. For the majority of its range, the front part of its back is blue-green. The only exception is in Mozambique, where the front part is red. In the eastern part of its range, the lower part of its back is green, and in the western part of its range, the lower part of its back is red. Tails can be either greenish or yellowish, like many other Platysaurus species. Two phases for the neck and chest can occur. The first phase has a blue throat, a black collar, and a mud-colored chest. The second phase has a yellow throat, black collar, and a green or blue chest.

This race occurs in all of Zimbabwe except the northeast, eastern Botswana, and the Limpopo.

=== P. i. nigrescens ===
P.i. nigrescens is 7.5–9 cm long. The male has a black head, chin, throat, chest, and belly. Yellow scales are scattered across this lizard's body. The tail is bright orange. This subspecies occurs near the Shoshong Hills, in northeastern Botswana.

=== P. i. subniger ===
P. i. subniger is similar in size to P. i. rhodesianus. The male of this subspecies has a dark green back which becomes brown or black in the rear of the back, with whitish spots. In males from Trelawney, Zimbabwe, their backs are uniform red, also with whitish spots. The tail and throat are orange (though the throat can also be yellow or white), while the chest and belly are black.

A female specimen lived 3.1 years in captivity.

=== P. i. parvus ===
P. i. parvus is 65–75 mm long. The males has a dark green back in the anterior, but the posterior part is red-brown. The back can also have whitish spots, similar to many other Platysaurus species. The tail is a dark orange, while the throat is pale blue. The neck has two black spots on either side. This is a reduced collar. The chest and belly are blue, similar to others of the genus. This race can be found on Blouberg, a mountain, in Limpopo Province.

=== P. i. natalensis ===
P. i. natalansis occurs in Swaziland and KwaZulu-Natal, a province of South Africa. The back is dark green, with white spots and stripes. The tail is orange. The throat is yellow or pale blue, with black spots and a black collar. The chest and belly are two different shades of blue.

=== P. i. intermedius ===
P. i. intermedius is 85–90 mm long, and was the first subspecies to be found. Their heads and bodies are green or brown, along with nearly nonexistent spots and stripes. The tails are either red or yellow. Their throats and bellies are blue, as are many other males in this species.

This subspecies is found around Pietersburg, North Province.

=== P. i. inopinus ===
P. i. inopinus males are similar to P. i. parvus in appearance and size. Two major differences are white thighs with black spotting and a lack of a reduced collar. P. i. inopinus can be found in the foothills of Blouberg, Northern Cape in South Africa.

=== P. i. nyasae ===
P. i. nyasae occurs in Malawi and central Mozambique. They were discovered in 1953.
