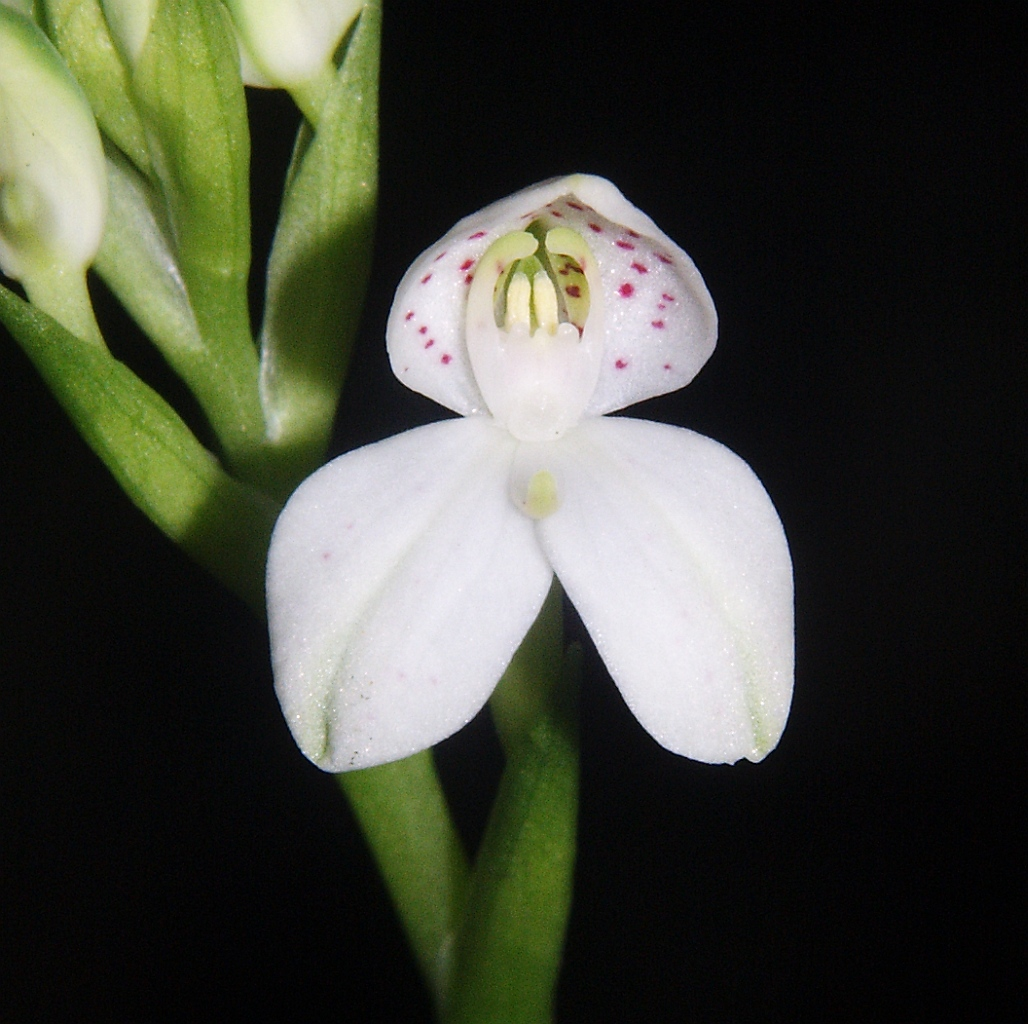

Scientific classification
- Kingdom: Plantae
- Clade: Tracheophytes
- Clade: Angiosperms
- Clade: Monocots
- Order: Asparagales
- Family: Orchidaceae
- Subfamily: Orchidoideae
- Genus: Disa
- Species: D. tripetaloides

Binomial name
- Disa tripetaloides (L.f.) N.E.Br.

Synonyms
- Orchis tripetaloides L.f. (Basionym); Satyrium excelsum Thunb.; Disa excelsa (Thunb.) Sw.; Disa venosa Lindl.; Disa falcata Schltr.; Herschelia excelsa (Thunb.) Kraenzl.; Herschelianthe excelsa (Thunb.) Rauschert

= Disa tripetaloides =

Species of orchid

Disa tripetaloides is a species of orchid that grows along the edges of streams in South Africa. This is one of the smaller species in the genus Disa in the section Disa. There are populations that come from the winter-rainfall areas of South Africa, and summer-rainfall areas of South Africa.

It is also one of the four commonly grown species of Disa in cultivation. The other three being Disa aurata, Disa cardinalis, and Disa uniflora. Disa tripetaloides is able to reproduce sexually and asexually. Asexual reproduction occurs by means of creating offshoots along the base of the plant and on stolons.
