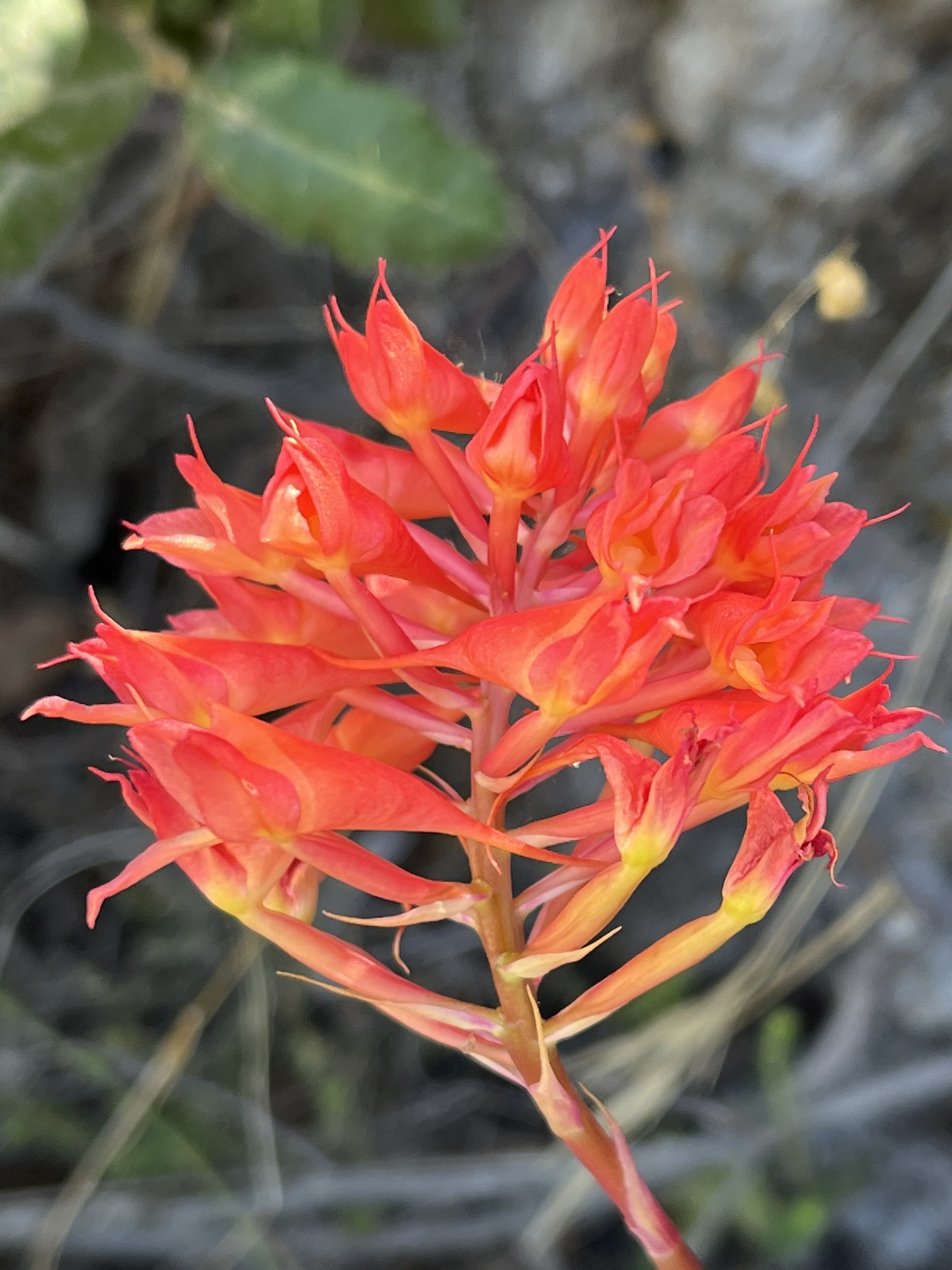

Scientific classification
- Kingdom: Plantae
- Clade: Tracheophytes
- Clade: Angiosperms
- Clade: Monocots
- Order: Asparagales
- Family: Orchidaceae
- Subfamily: Orchidoideae
- Genus: Disa
- Species: D. ferruginea

Binomial name
- Disa ferruginea Sw.

= Disa ferruginea =

Species of flowering plant

Disa ferruginea also known as the cluster disa, is a species of orchid from South Africa.

== Description ==
Disa ferruginea is a sturdy, reed-like terrestrial plant that typically grows between 200 and 450 mm tall. It has linear radical leaves that develop after flowering, while the dry cauline leaves form sheaths. The inflorescence is dense, with 1 to 40 flowers. The flowers themselves are bright red to orange, often with some yellow components. The median sepal has an apiculate tip, and a galea (hood-like structure) is 8 to 10 mm deep. The slender spur of the flower grades into the galea and measures 7 to 20 mm long. The lateral sepals project outward and are elliptic to narrowly elliptic, with apiculi that can reach up to 4 mm in length. The petals are spear-shaped and 5 to 7 mm long, while the lip is narrowly egg- to spear-shaped and 10 to 12 mm long.

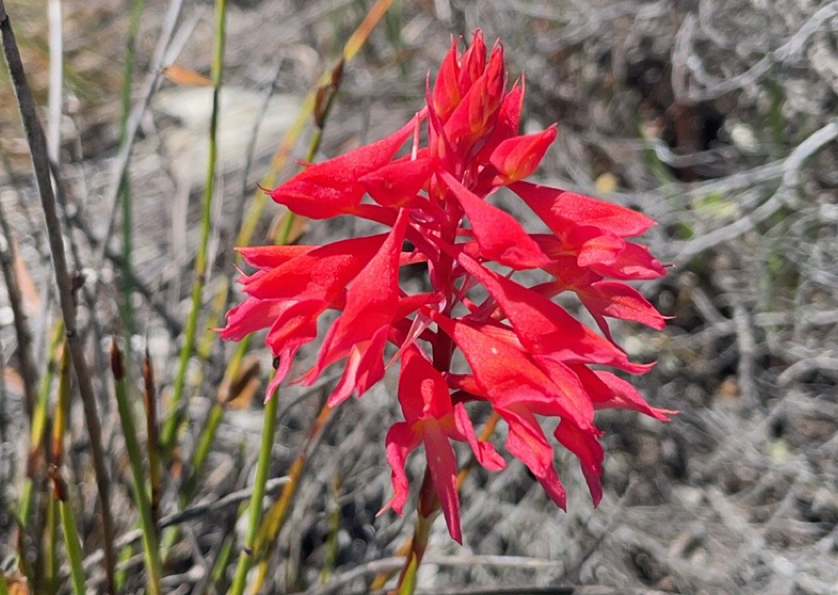

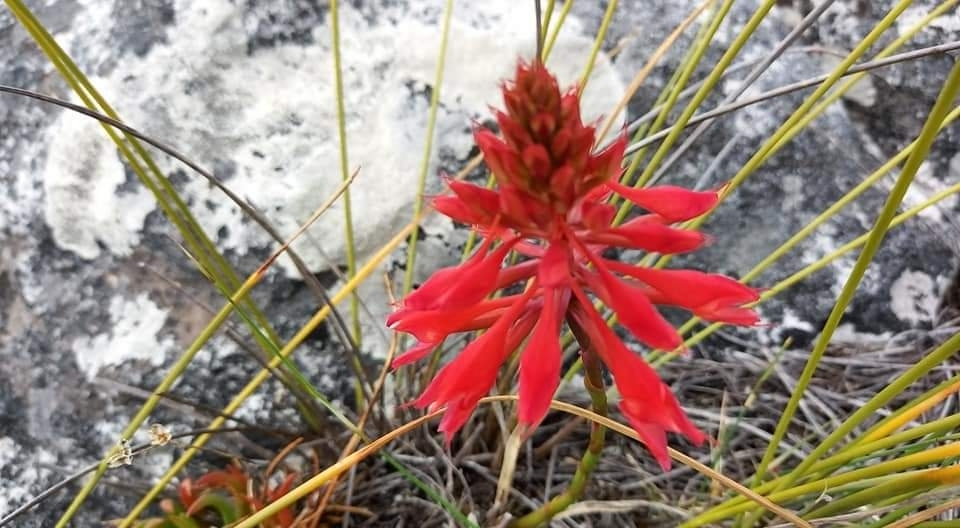

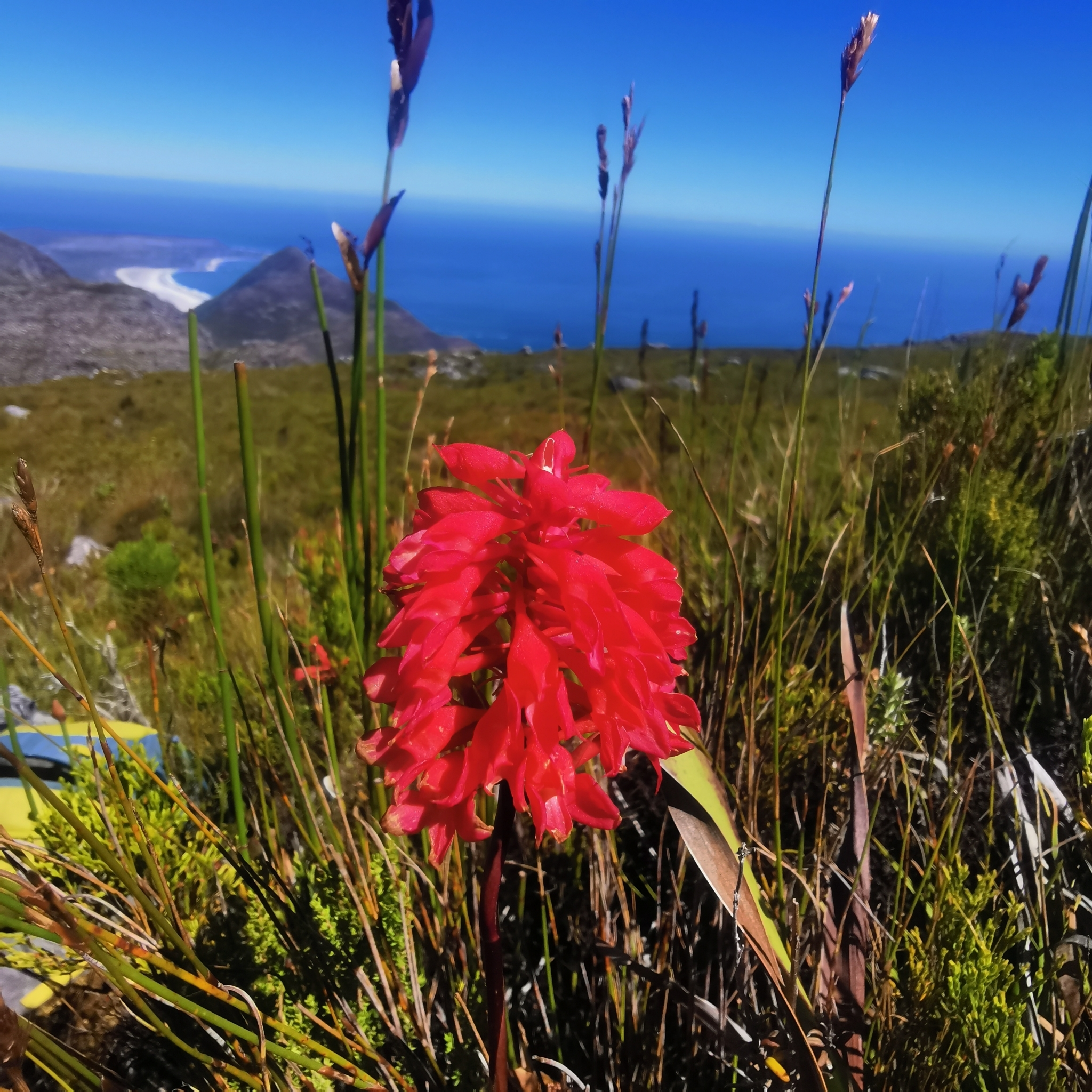

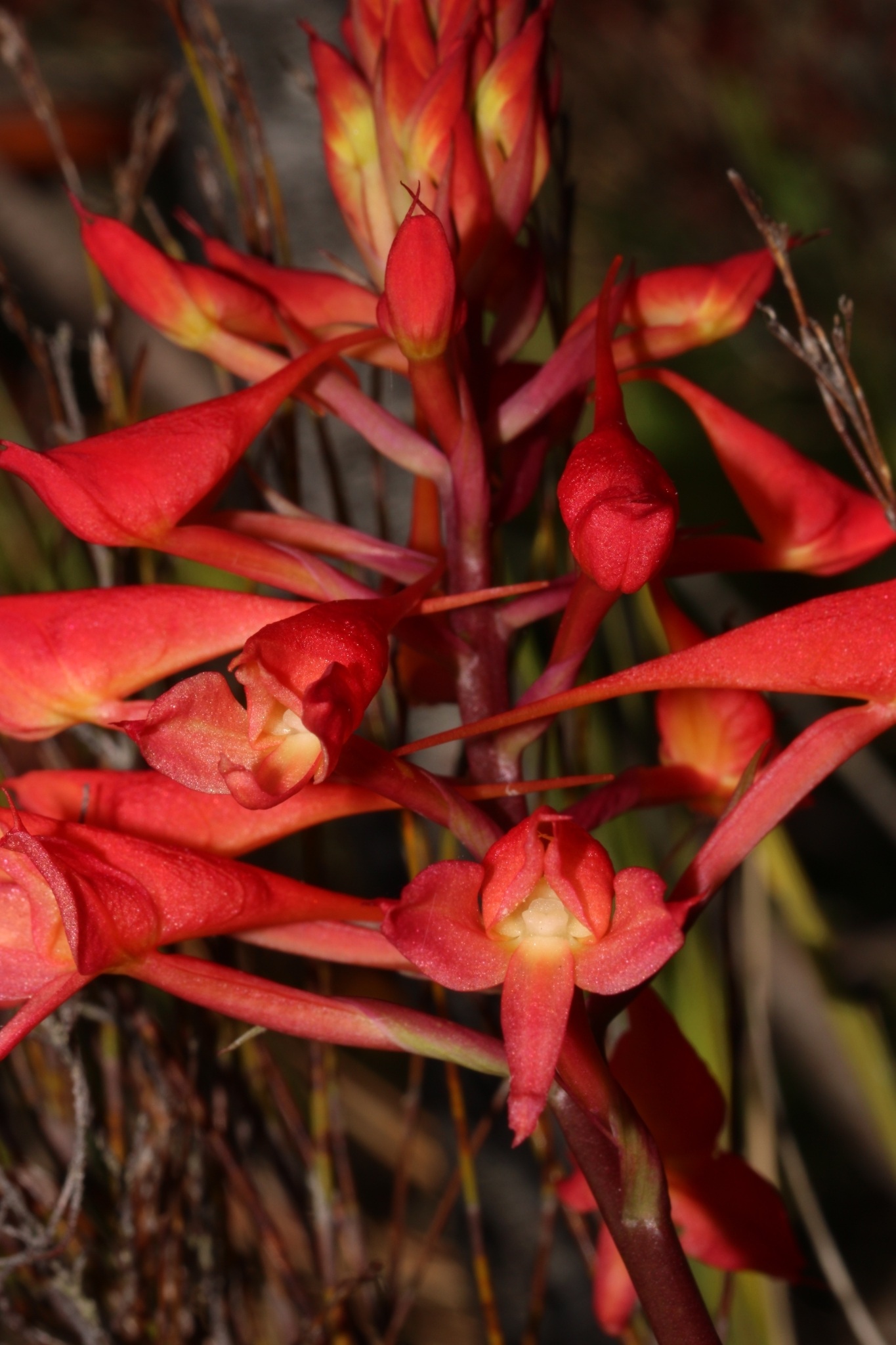

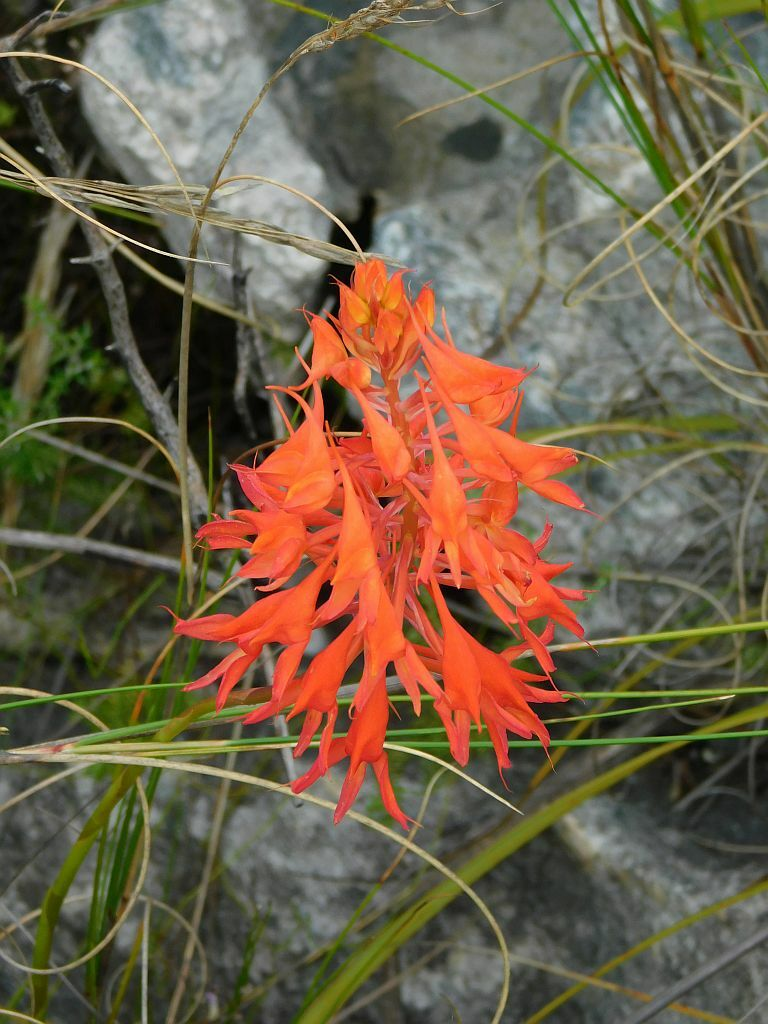

== Distribution ==
The species is endemic to the South-Western Cape of South Africa, specifically in the fynbos vegetation.

== Habitat ==
Disa ferruginea is occasionally or commonly found in dry to slightly damp areas, usually in the zone of the southeaster clouds, ranging from 400 to 1,500 m. It is pollinated by the mountain pride butterfly and hybridizes very rarely with D. graminifolia. The plant blooms between February and March, with fire serving as a stimulus for flowering.

== Pollination ==
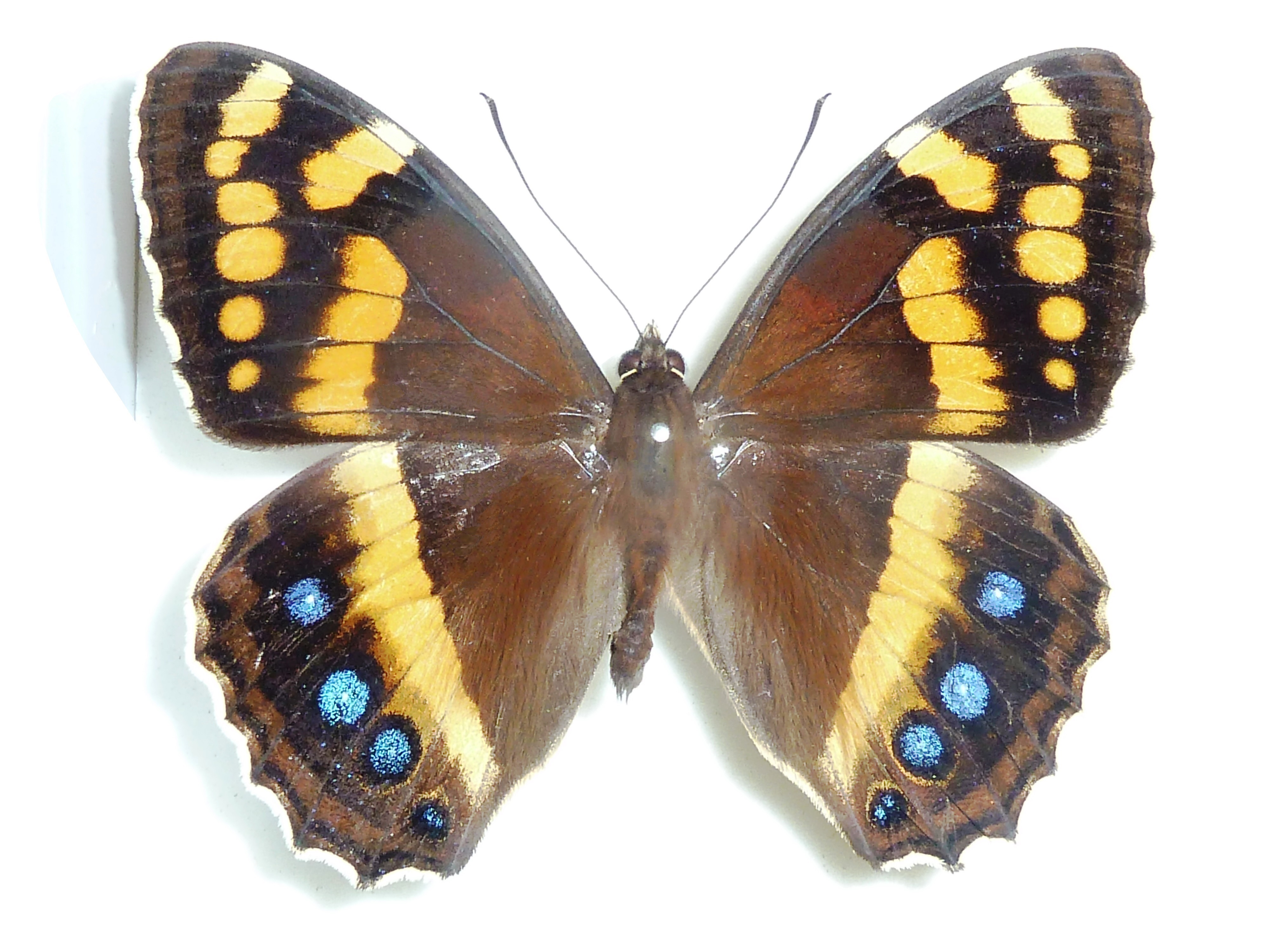
Aeropetes tulbaghia, the cluster disa's only pollinator.

The species is exclusively pollinated by the mountain pride butterfly (Aeropetes tulbaghia). It does not produce nectar for the butterfly, instead deceiving it by mimicking the flowers of species that do produce nectar. In south-western Cape, a red-flowered form mimics the red reedpipe (Tritioniopsis triticea), while in the Langeberg Mountains, an orange-flowered form mimics the red hot poker (Kniphofia uvaria).

Disa ferruginea is most closely related to either Disa porrecta or Disa gladioliflora, both of which also use deceptive mimicry to lure its pollinators. The former is another red-flowered and butterfly-pollinated species, while the latter is pink-flowered and pollinated by flies and Amegilla bees.

Mimicked species being pollinated by Aeropetes tulbaghia

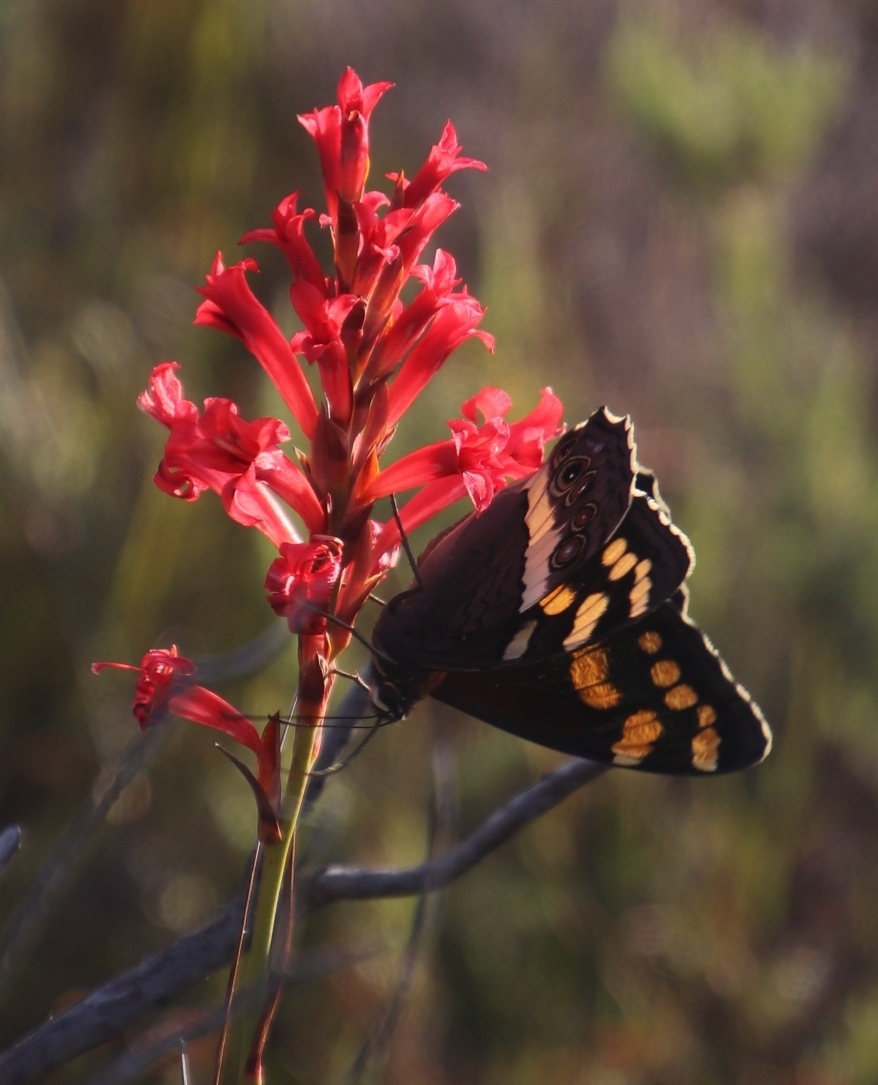
Tritioniopsis triticea

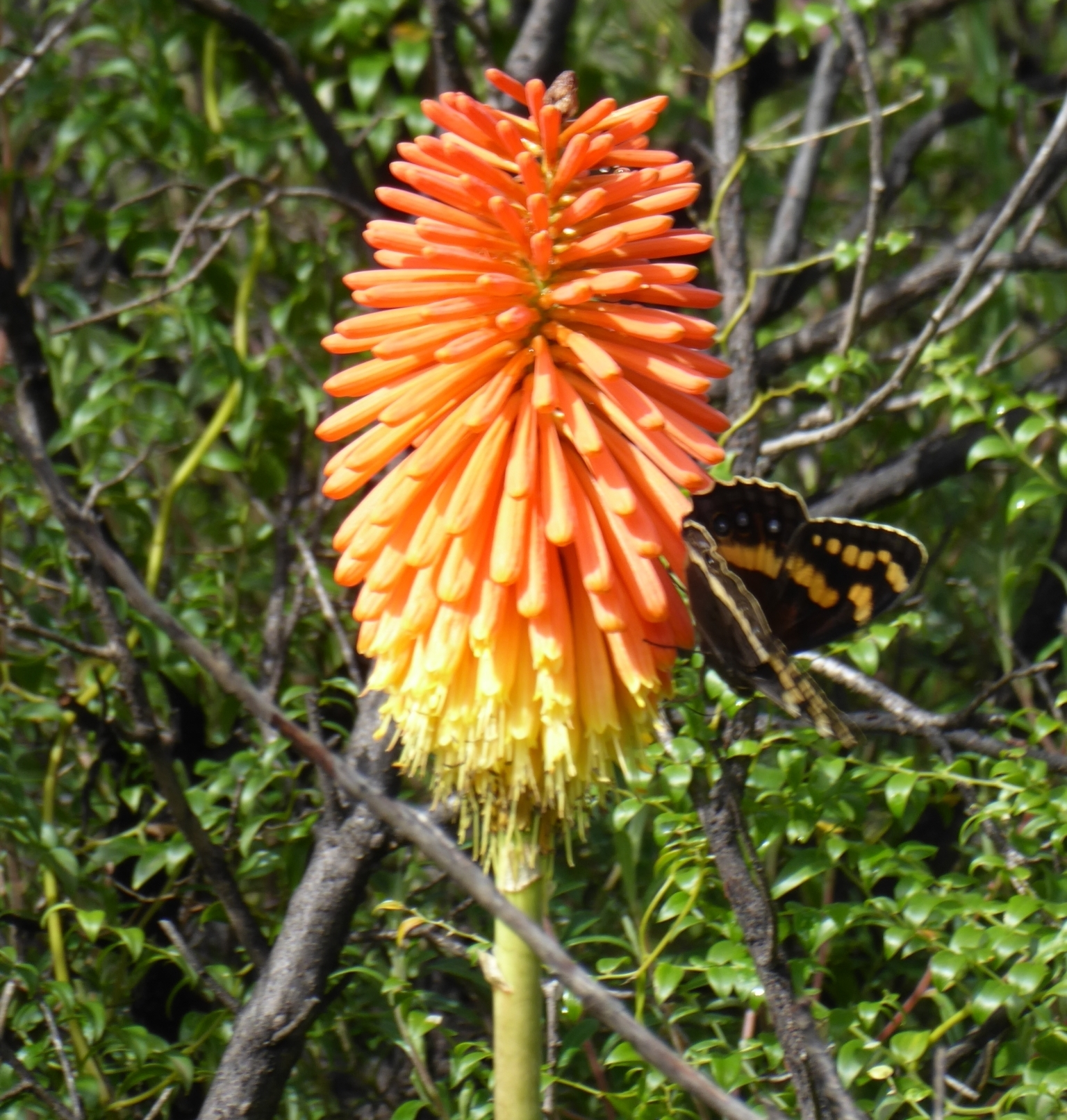
Kniphofia uvaria
