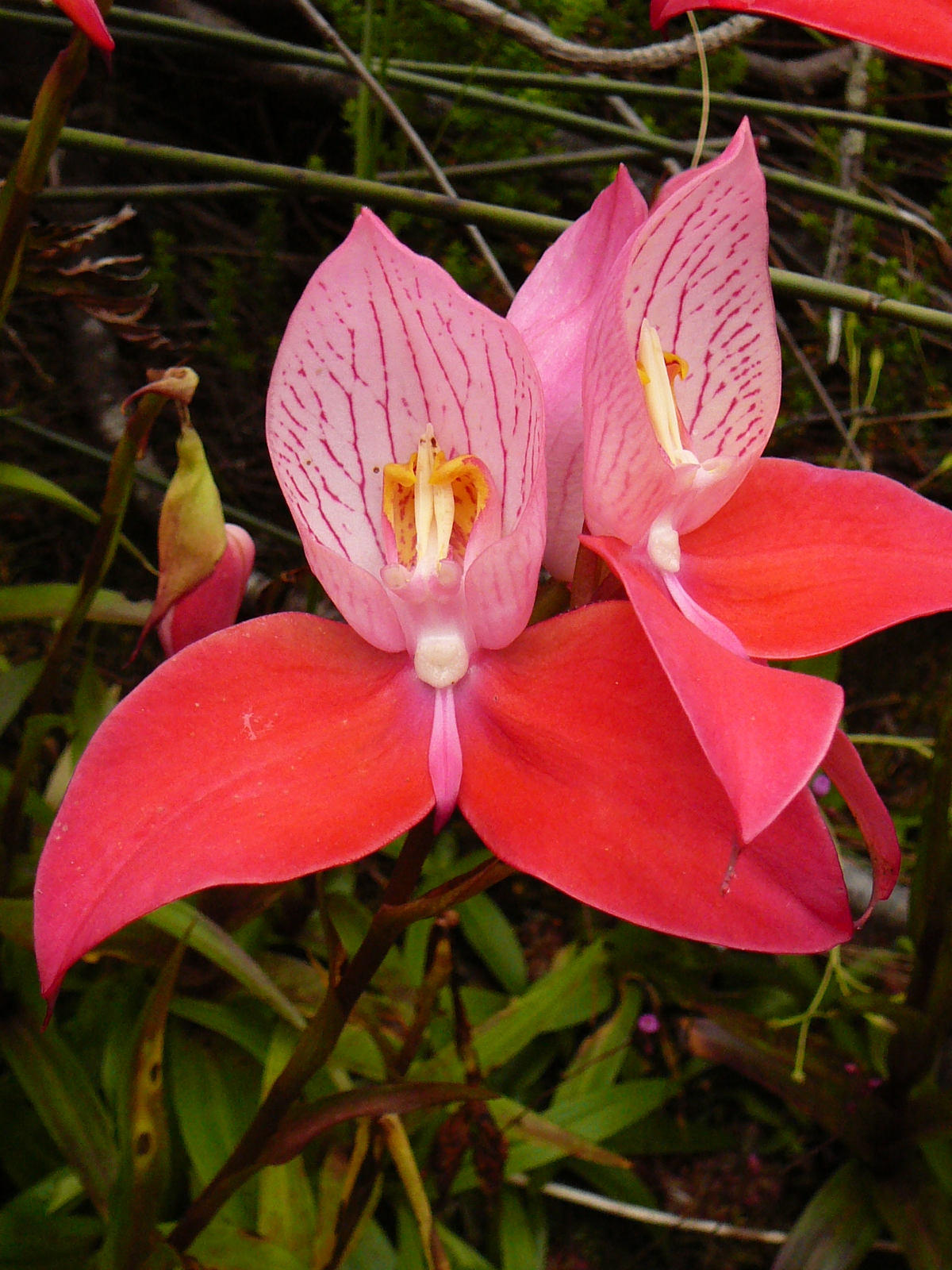

Scientific classification
- Kingdom: Plantae
- Clade: Embryophytes
- Clade: Tracheophytes
- Clade: Spermatophytes
- Clade: Angiosperms
- Clade: Monocots
- Order: Asparagales
- Family: Orchidaceae
- Subfamily: Orchidoideae
- Genus: Disa
- Species: D. uniflora

Binomial name
- Disa uniflora P.J.Bergius, 1767

Synonyms
- Disa grandiflora L.f.; Satyrium grandiflorum Thunb.

= Disa uniflora =

Species of flowering plant in the orchid family

Disa uniflora, the red disa or pride of Table Mountain, is a South African species of orchid in the family Orchidaceae. It is the type species of the genus Disa, and one of its best-known members. It is occasionally referred to by its old name Disa grandiflora.

== Distribution ==
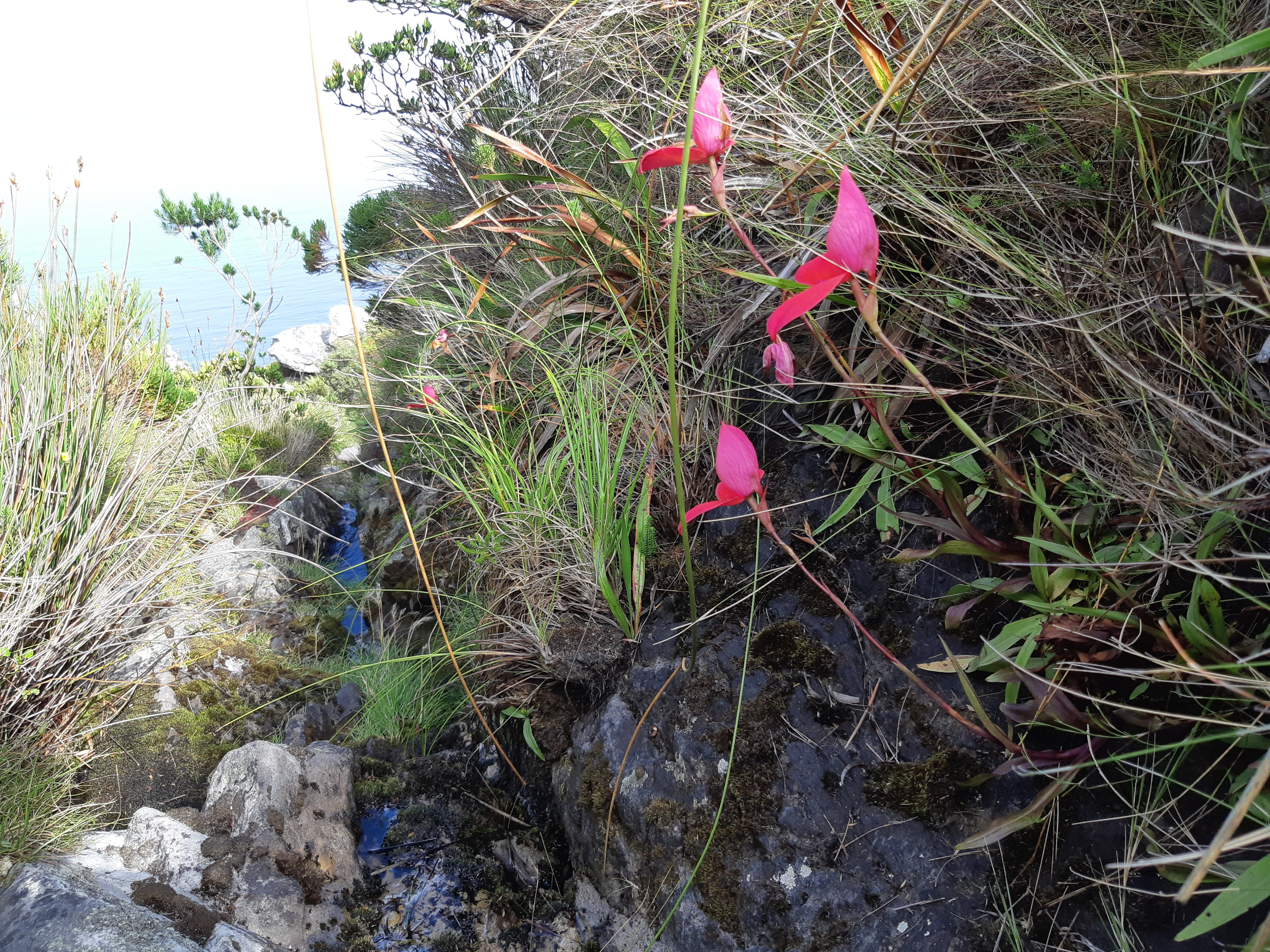
Disa uniflora along a stream in its natural habitat on the slopes of the Cape Fold Belt mountains

Its range is restricted to the Sandstone Mountains of the South Western Cape, South Africa, west of Hermanus to Table Mountain and northwards into the Cederberg Mountains. It is common on Table Mountain, and the Back Table, but is rarely seen further south on the Cape Peninsula. The orchid grows near waterfalls, streamlets, and seeps in the mountains. It is, however, never found along the shores of dams whose water levels vary considerably during the year.

== Description ==
It is a fairly stout perennial 15–60 cm (5.9–24 in) in height, spreading by stolons. The leaves are lance shaped, the lower ones spreading or semi-erect up to 25 cm (9.8 in) long. The inflorescence is 1–3 flowered. The blooms are showy, and can be 10 cm across the laterally spreading sepals, which are scarlet to carmine in color. The middle, upright sepal is pinkish on the inside with scarlet veins. The petals, which are very much smaller than the sepals, are erect colored yellow with red spots at their tops, but pale scarlet at their bases. It blooms during the summer months, particularly in January, but continuing into March.

=== Pollination ===
Its pollination is one of the most complex of all the orchids, involving the mountain pride butterfly, Aeropetes tulbaghia. Though unscented, the flowers attract the butterfly with their vibrant red colour and by rewarding it with nectar. This is in contrast to its congener D. ferruginea which is also exclusively pollinated by the mountain pride butterfly, but offers no nectar reward, instead attracting the butterfly by imitating species whose flowers do produce nectar.

== As an emblem ==
The Mountain Club of South Africa, the Western Province Rugby Team and the Western Province sports use the image of this species on their badges and logos. It has been the Mountain Club's logo since its founding in 1891. The flowers are also depicted on the obverse side of the Pro Merito Medal (1975).

Sport an emblem
| Association | Sport |
|---|---|
| Western Province Athletes | Athletes |
| Cape Town Metro Aquatics | Aquatics |
| Western Province Bowls | Bowls |
| Western Province Hockey | Field Hockey |
| Western Province Ice Hockey Association | Ice Hockey |
| Cape Town District, Western Cape Gymnastics Association | Gymnastics |
| The Mountain Club of South Africa | Mountaineering |
| Western Province Rugby Football Union | Rugby Union |
| Western Province Figure Skating Association | Figure Skating |
| Western Province Surfing | Surfing |

== Gallery ==
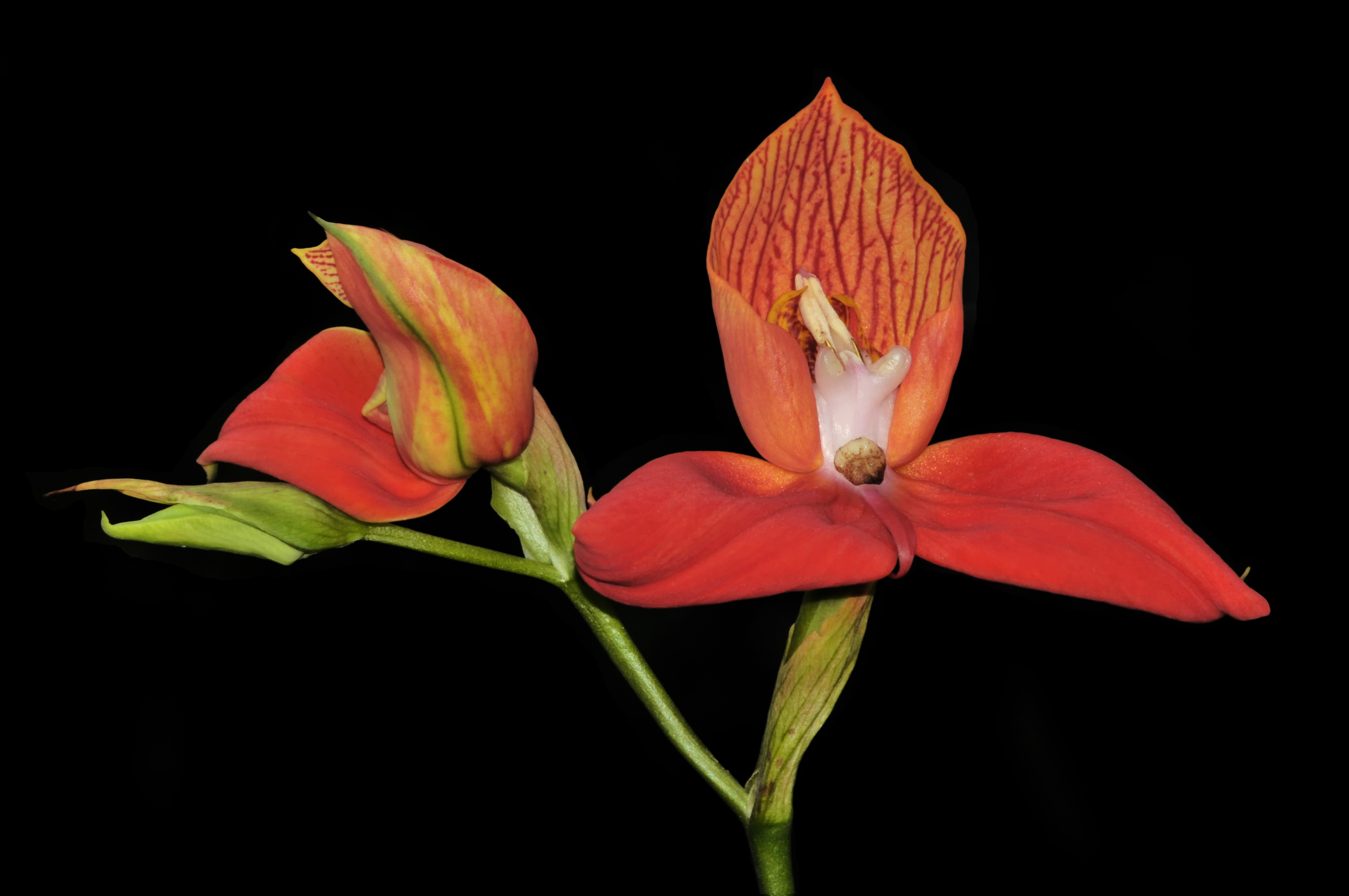
Disa uniflora has been named by Peter Jonas Bergius in 1767

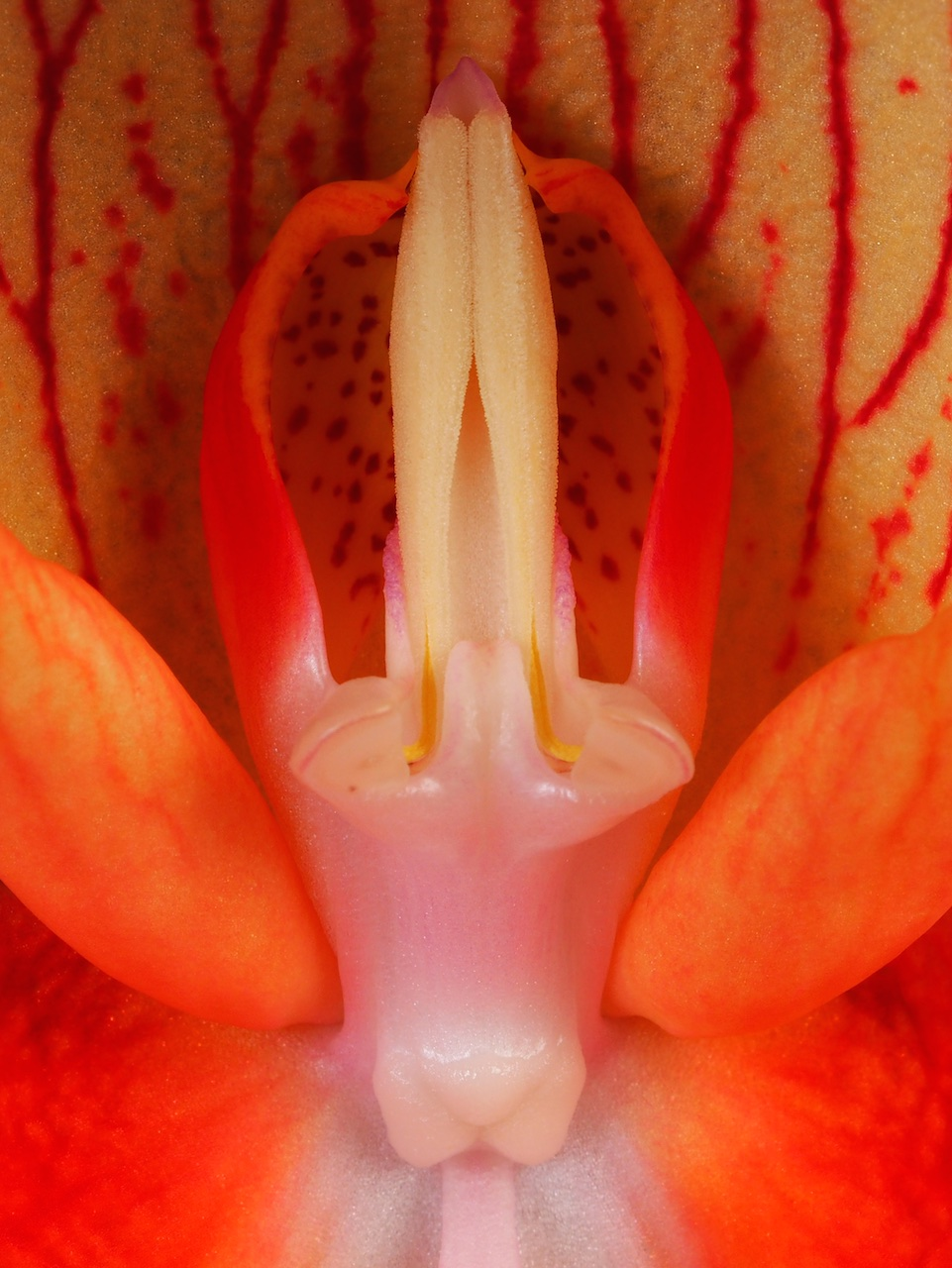
The column of the flower corresponds to the fusion of both male and female parts.

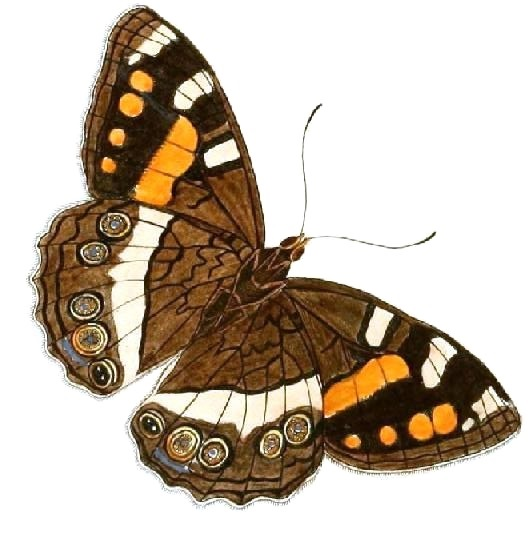
Disa uniflora is entirely dependent on the mountain pride butterfly, Aeropetes tulbaghia, for its pollination.

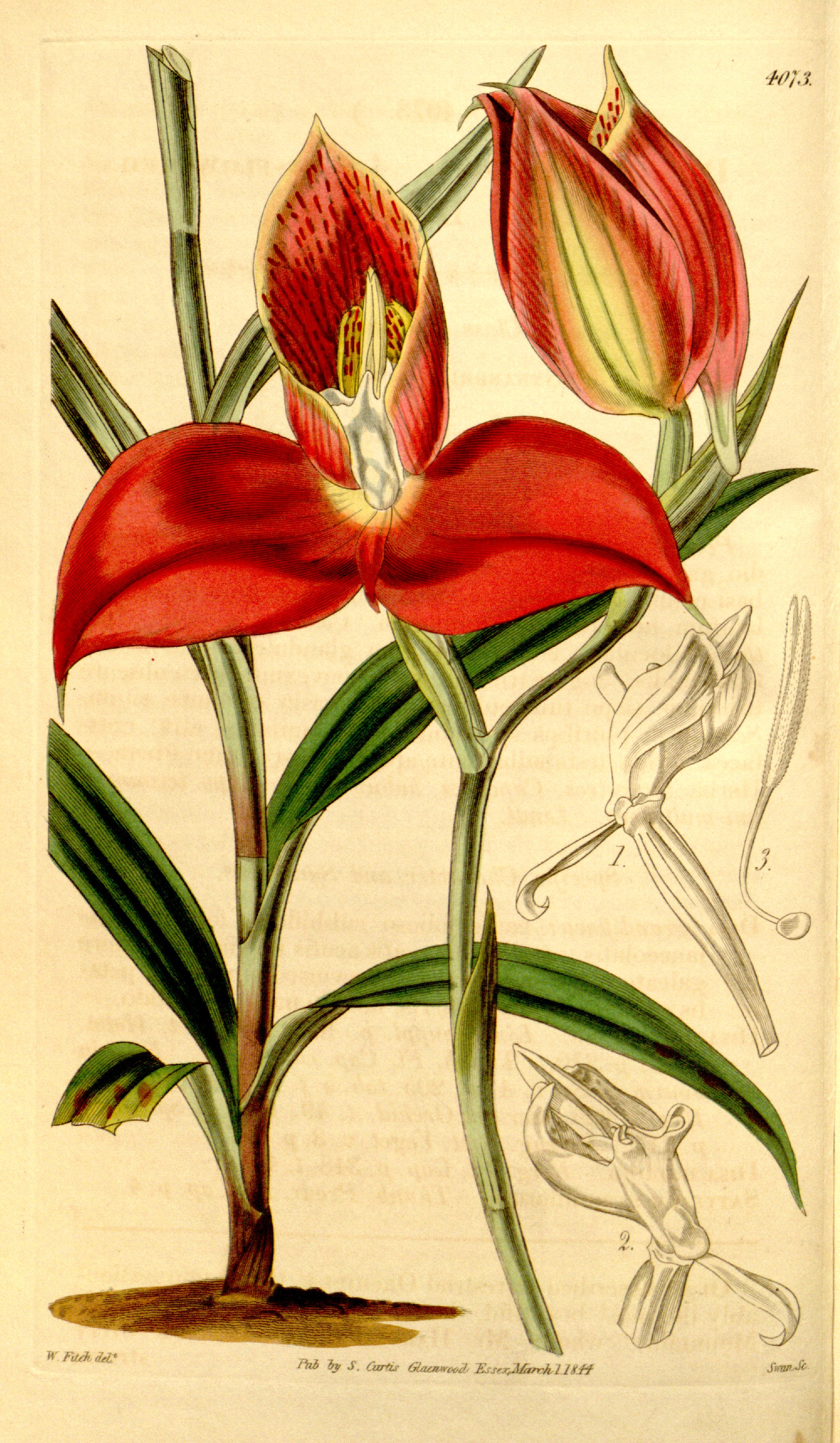
1844 plate by Walter Hood Fitch from Curtis's Botanical Magazine

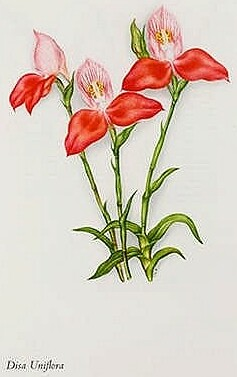
Watercolour by Ethel Dixie

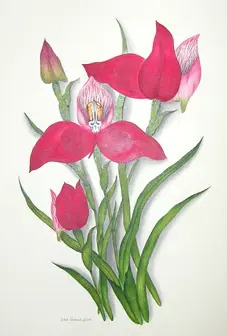
Coloured drawing by Ethel Dixie

== See also ==
- Disa Park
