= Marlothiella =

Conservation status
- Least Concern (IUCN 3.1)

Scientific classification
- Kingdom: Plantae
- Clade: Embryophytes
- Clade: Tracheophytes
- Clade: Angiosperms
- Clade: Eudicots
- Clade: Asterids
- Order: Apiales
- Family: Apiaceae
- Subfamily: Apioideae
- Tribe: Marlothielleae; Magee, C.I.Calviño, Mei Liu, S.R.Downie, Tilney & B.-E.van Wyk
- Genus: Marlothiella; H.Wolff
- Species: M. gummifera

Binomial name
- Marlothiella gummifera H.Wolff

Species of flowering plant

Marlothiella gummifera is a species of flowering plant in the family Apiaceae, and the only species in the monotypic genus Marlothiella. It is endemic to Namibia, where its natural habitats are rocky areas and cold desert. It is also the only genus in the tribe Marlothielleae, of the subfamily Apioideae.

The genus name of Marlothiella is in honour of Rudolf Marloth (1855–1931), a German-born South African botanist, pharmacist and analytical chemist, best known for his Flora of South Africa. The Latin specific epithet of gummifera is derived from gummifer meaning gummy. Both genus and species were first described and published in Bot. Jahrb. Syst. Vol.48 on pages 263 in 1912.
