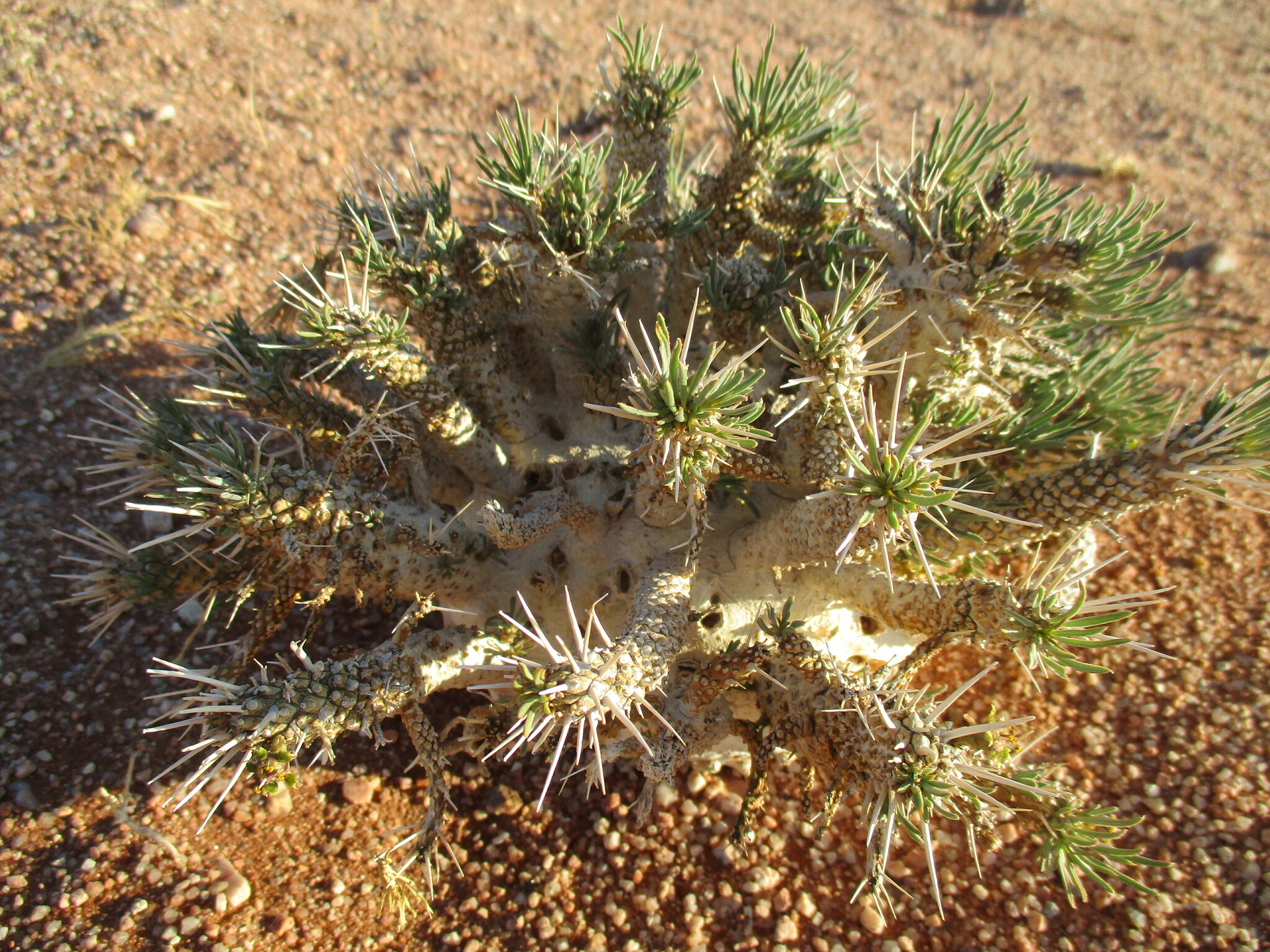

Conservation status
- Least Concern (IUCN 3.1)

Scientific classification
- Kingdom: Plantae
- Clade: Tracheophytes
- Clade: Angiosperms
- Clade: Eudicots
- Clade: Rosids
- Order: Malpighiales
- Family: Euphorbiaceae
- Genus: Euphorbia
- Species: E. namibensis

Binomial name
- Euphorbia namibensis Marloth

Synonyms
- Heterotypic Synonyms: Euphorbia argillicola Dinter; Euphorbia orabensis Dinter

= Euphorbia namibensis =

Species of flowering plant

Euphorbia namibensis is a species of succulent plant in the family Euphorbiaceae. It is endemic to Namibia. Its natural habitat is the southern part of the Namib Desert in southern Namibia. It grows in gravelly and sandy ground.
