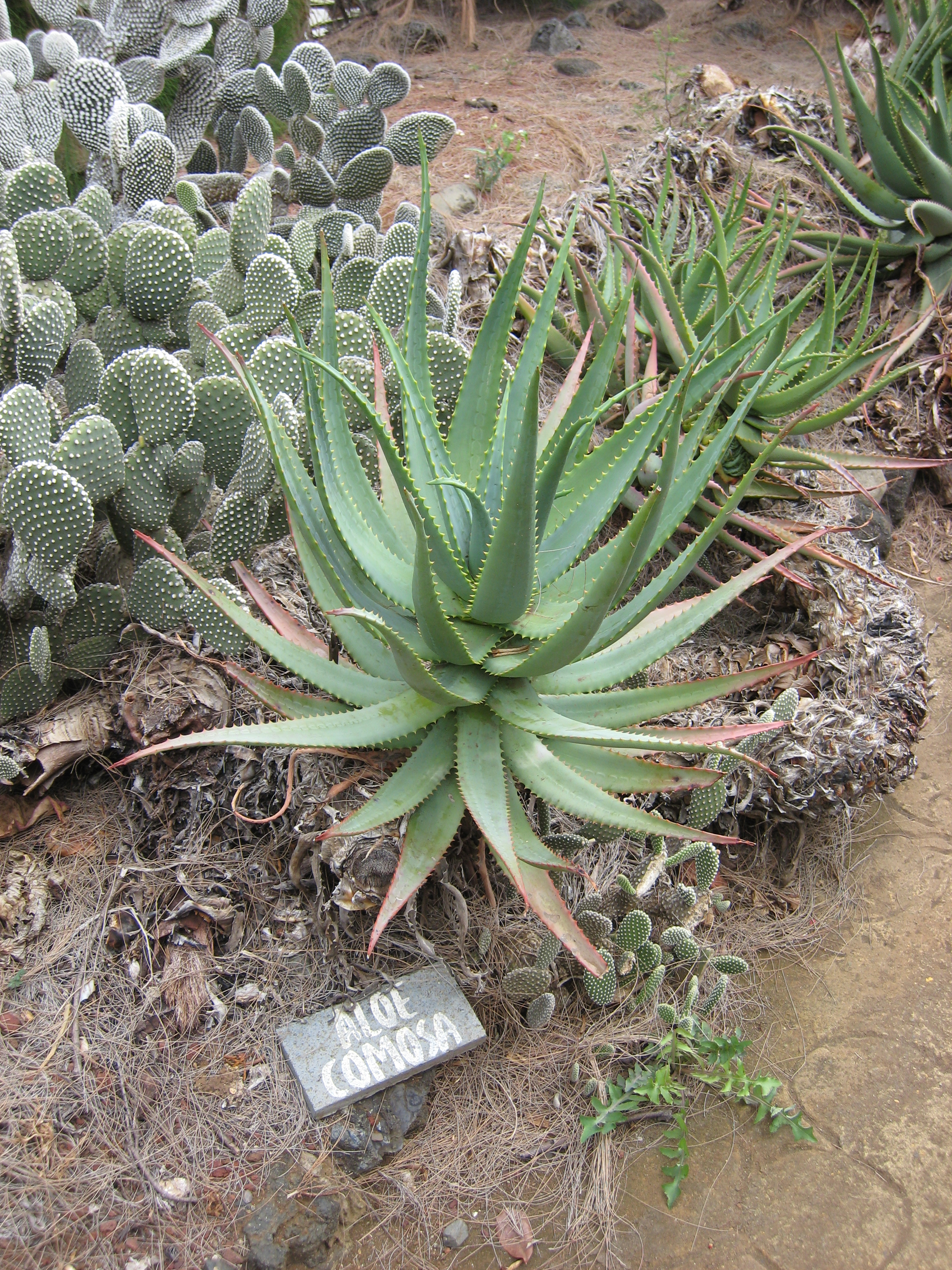

Conservation status
- Data Deficient (IUCN 2.3)
- CITES Appendix II

Scientific classification
- Kingdom: Plantae
- Clade: Tracheophytes
- Clade: Angiosperms
- Clade: Monocots
- Order: Asparagales
- Family: Asphodelaceae
- Subfamily: Asphodeloideae
- Genus: Aloe
- Species: A. comosa

Binomial name
- Aloe comosa Marloth & A.Berger

= Aloe comosa =

Species of flowering plant

Aloe comosa is a species of flowering plant in the Asphodelaceae family. It is commonly called Clanwilliam aloe and is endemic to South Africa.

== Description ==
Typically, Aloe comosa has thick, succulent leaf blades approximately 2 feet (0.6 metres) long. The leaves are lanceolate with a glabrous surface. The edges of the leaves are entire, curved upwards (involute) and lined with spiny, tooth-like, brown-red thorns. The fleshy blades have a whorled leaf insertion as they emerge from the rosette which is at the end of an erect stem.

Aloe comosa is considered a tree aloe, having a single, unbranched stem which may attain heights of approximately 3 m (9.8 ft). As it matures and grows in height, it retains its dry, dead leaves which form a tangled mass resembling a skirt or a beard. Tree aloe bark differs from woody dicot bark in that it does not have a phellogen, which is the meristematic tissue that differentiates into bark. In essence, aloe bark is actually overlapping, irregular layers of incomplete bark tissues. A study in 1983 considered the purpose of retaining dead leaves by several species of tree aloe. Previous ideas were that dead-leaf retention protected bare bark from the sun during the day and the cold at night or that the thorny mass of leaves could deter unwanted wild life in search for water, nectar, or seeds. It was proposed that dead-leaf retention was selected to provide thick, fire resistant bark in a fire-prone habitat.

=== Reproduction ===
Naturally, Aloe comosa follows the typical angiosperm life cycle. Like most South African aloes, it blooms in the summer. Tall inflorescences (flower stems) that can reach 2 metres (6.7 feet) in height branch from the rosette. At the tips of the inflorescences are flower spikes which are composed of many small, tightly compacted flowers. In most cases the color of the flower spikes ranges from rosy-cream to ivory-pink and is pale at the bottom of the spike with a darker pink hue on the upper parts. Pollination is carried out primarily by bees, although it is plausible that some evening moths could be pollinating this species as well.

The seeds are produced in late February and early March of each year in time for the winter rains; the seasonal shift in the southern hemisphere is opposite that of the northern hemisphere. Once the seed capsules turn pale green, they will split and expose their flat, brown seeds. These seeds are enclosed by a thin, transparent membrane which aid in transporting the seeds. In the event of a sufficient breeze, the seeds are dispersed and blown some distance from the parent plant where they usually germinate under the protection of a nurse plant.

== Taxonomy ==
Aloe comosa is the botanical name for what is commonly known as Clanwilliam aloe. The person who discovered the species has not been recorded but those that contributed its botanical name were two German botanists, Alwin Berger and Hermann Wilhelm Rudolf Marloth, whom specialized in South African botany and the nomenclature of succulent plants.

== Distribution ==
Aloe comosa inhabits a very small region within the Western Cape province of South Africa. It was discovered in the Olifants River Valley in 1905, north of the town Clanwilliam (hence its common name).

== Uses ==
The genus Aloe currently consists of over 650 species. A few species of aloe are used to treat minor thermal burns, itching, and sunburn by applying the thick, mucilaginous gel to the skin, but Aloe comosa is not one of those species. Its only apparent uses are a decorative house plant and collector's item. Even though Aloe comosa is indigenous to the Western Cape of South Africa, it is possible for experienced collectors and horticulturalists to maintain their plants outdoors, in Arizona and California for instance, or in a desert climate greenhouse.
