= World Climbing Africa Championship =

Biennial African championships for competition climbing

IFSC African Climbing Championships
- Status: active
- Genre: sporting event
- Date: mid-year
- Begins: 2020
- Frequency: biennial
- Country: varying
- Inaugurated: 2020
- Major events: Competition climbing
- Organiser: International Federation of Sport Climbing

The World Climbing Africa Championship is a competition climbing event in which representatives of African countries compete in a number of events. Organized by the World Climbing, the event has existed since 2020.

There was an official IFSC African Qualifier held in Pretoria, South Africa from 7–9 December 2023. This event served as the African continental qualifying competition (often treated as the African Championships or continental qualifier) for the 2024 Paris Olympics, awarding Olympic quota spots to top climbers. the following years from 2024 to 2025 there is no official competitions held.

== Editions ==
| Edition | Host city | Best Nation |
|---|---|---|
| 2020 | Cape Town, South Africa | South Africa |
| 2021 | Johannesburg, South Africa | South Africa |
| 2023 (Note: the 2023 IFSC African Climbing Championships Qualifiers serve as a qualifier for the 2024 Summer Olympics) | Pretoria, South Africa | South Africa |
