= South African National Climbing Federation =

Governing body for competition climbing

- Sport: Competition climbing
- Jurisdiction: South Africa
- Abbreviation: SANCF
- Founded: 2010
- Affiliation: International Federation of Sport Climbing
- Headquarters: Johannesburg
- Location: Jukskei Park 2153
- President: Bevin Gibson-Taylor
- Secretary: Tracy Potgieter

Official website
- www.sancf.org
- (South Africa)

South African National Climbing Federation (SANCF) which has been renamed SA Climbing, is the governing body for competition climbing, involving competition lead climbing, competition bouldering and competition speed climbing in South Africa. SANCF oversees competitive climbing across the country as well as the promotion and development of the sport in artificial climbing environments. SANCF is affiliated to the world body International Federation of Sport Climbing (IFSC) with full member status, and SASCOC.

SANCF organises national competitions across various age (including under 13, under 15, under 17, under 19 and open), and gender categories in the main disciplines such as the National Boulder Series Championships and National Lead Climbing Competition in addition to sending representative teams to compete at international events. South African climbers also participate in the Montagu Rock Rally, Boven Rock Rally, and The Rory Challenge.

== History ==
The South African National Climbing Federation (SANCF) was founded in 2010, with the aim of the promotion of sport climbing among South African youths. It is an organisation run with the help of volunteers who share their experience and talents. SANCF was affiliated to the world governing body IFSC in 2010, which made it possible for it to send a team of 16 youths, as South Africa's first competitive climbing team, to the 2011 IFSC World Youth Championships held in Imst, Austria.

== See also ==
- Sport in South Africa
- Mountain Club of South Africa
