= Marlothistella =

Scientific classification
- Kingdom: Plantae
- Clade: Tracheophytes
- Clade: Angiosperms
- Clade: Eudicots
- Order: Caryophyllales
- Family: Aizoaceae
- Subfamily: Ruschioideae
- Tribe: Ruschieae
- Genus: Marlothistella; Schwantes

Genus of flowering plant

Marlothistella is a genus of flowering plants belonging to the family Aizoaceae. It is native to the Cape Provinces of South Africa.

The genus name of Marlothistella is in honour of Rudolf Marloth (1855–1931), a German-born South African botanist, pharmacist and analytical chemist, best known for his Flora of South Africa. It was first described and published in Gartenwelt Vol.32 on page 599 in 1928.

Species Known, according to Kew:

- Marlothistella stenophylla (L.Bolus) S.A.Hammer
- Marlothistella uniondalensis Schwantes
