= Marco Maria Scolaris =

Italian climber and IFSC president

Marco Scolaris
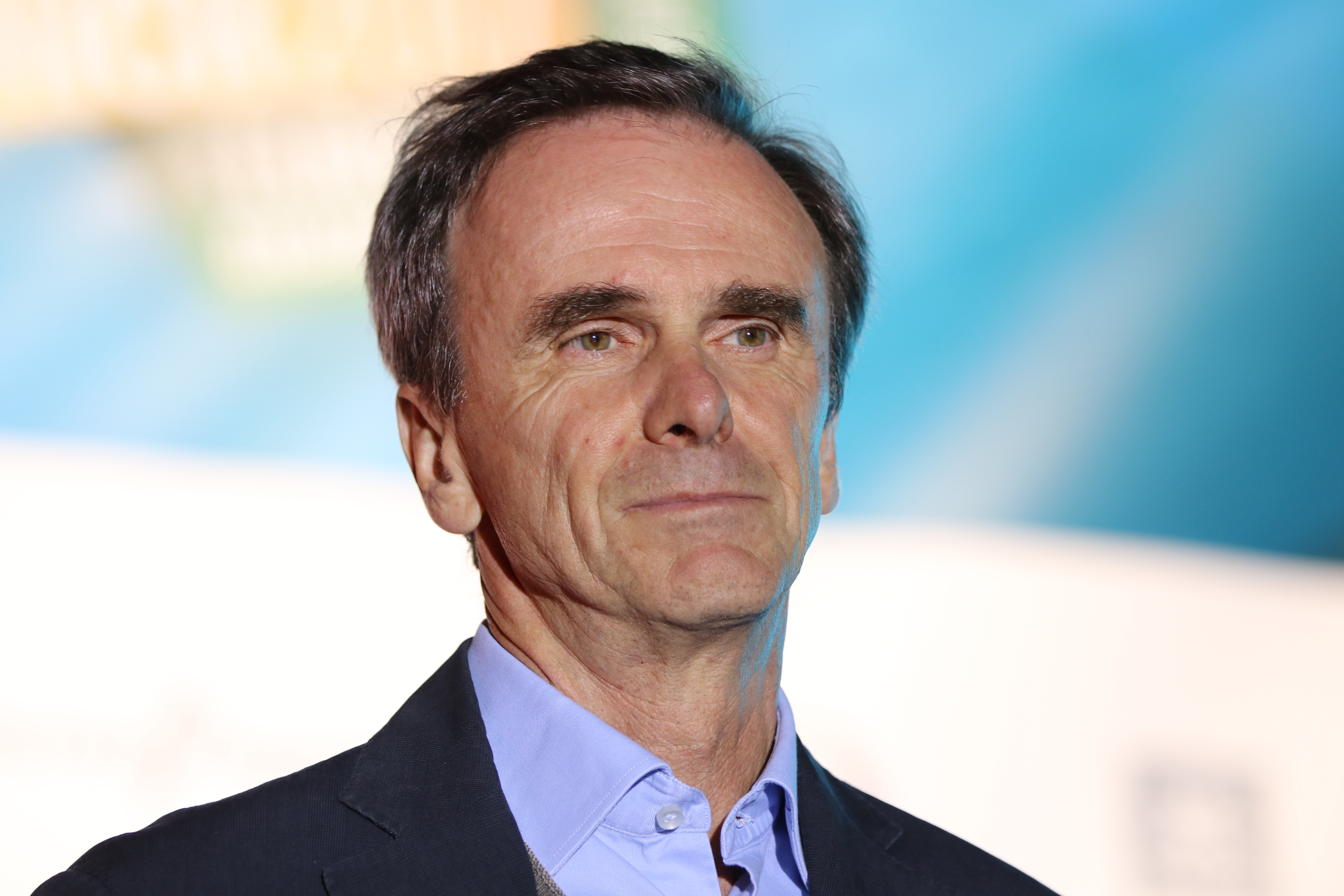
- Marco Scolaris in 2017 (WC Munich)

Personal information
- Born: 24 July 1958 (age 68) Turin, Italy
- Height: 1.80 m (5 ft 11 in)
- Weight: 72 kg (159 lb)

Climbing career
- Type of climber: Bouldering; Competition climbing

Marco Maria Scolaris (born 1958) is a professional photographer and former amateur rock climber who founded the International Federation of Sport Climbing (IFSC), which is the international governing body for competition climbing in the disciplines of lead climbing, bouldering, and speed climbing.

== Biography ==
As an active boulderer in his twenties, in 1988, Scolaris founded the 'Federazione Arrampicata Sportiva Italiana', which was independent of the Club Alpino Italiano. In 1990 it became a member federation of the Italian National Olympic Committee. Also in 1988, he became an international judge at competition climbing events for the UIAA (the then regulator of competition climbing), and then a trainer for international judges in 1989. As a 'UIAA Climbing' delegate he attended more than 40 events of the International Climbing and Mountaineering Federation (UIAA). From 1996 to 1997 he was the president of the 'UIAA Commission for Competition Climbing'. Together with Pascal Mouche, he founded the 'UIAA Council for Competition Climbing' and was the secretary general from 1997 to 2001 before becoming the president from 2001 to 2006.

In 2006, Scolaris organized the separation of international competition climbing events (i.e. competition lead climbing, competition bouldering, and competition speed climbing) from the UIAA. In 2007, he founded the International Federation of Sport Climbing (IFSC) and became the first president. Scolaris was re-elected as head of the IFSC in 2009, and 2013 (there are no term limits).
