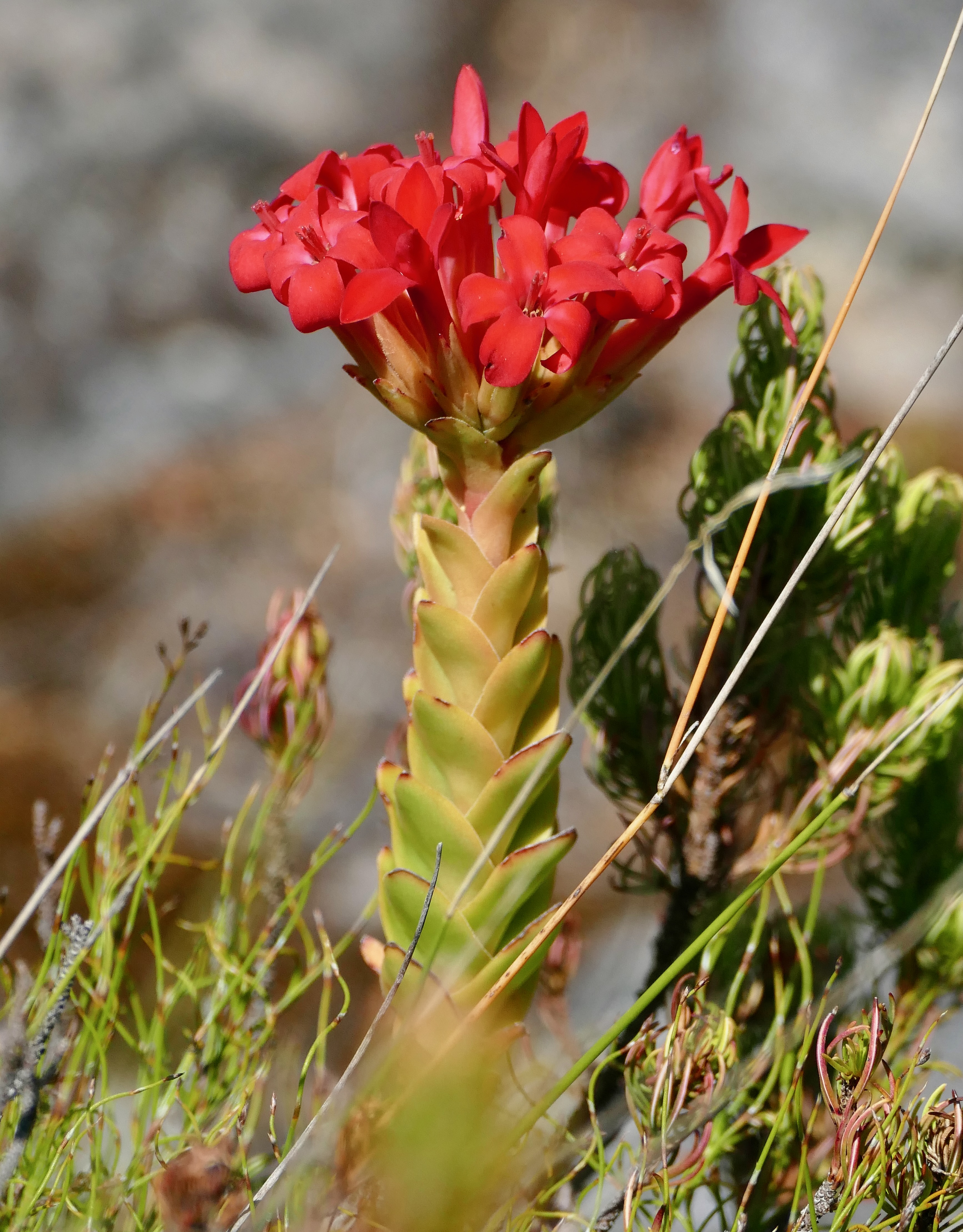
- Table Mountain National Park

Conservation status
- Least Concern (SANBI Red List)

Scientific classification
- Kingdom: Plantae
- Clade: Embryophytes
- Clade: Tracheophytes
- Clade: Spermatophytes
- Clade: Angiosperms
- Clade: Eudicots
- Order: Saxifragales
- Family: Crassulaceae
- Genus: Crassula
- Species: C. coccinea

Binomial name
- Crassula coccinea L.

Synonyms
- Danielia coccinea; Dietrichia coccinea; Kalosanthes coccinea; Larochea coccinea; Rochea coccinea; Sedum rochea

= Crassula coccinea =

Plant species in the stonecrop family

Crassula coccinea, the red crassula, is a plant in the stonecrop family from South Africa.

== Description ==
Red crassulas are small shrub-like succulent plants growing 30 to 60 cm tall. The few stems can grow upwards or sprawl outwards and branch from the base of the plant. Older plants have dry, brown stem bases while being covered in green new growth towards the tops. They can be as much as 1.3 cm thick and become woody with age.

The leaves are arranged in four rows along the length of the stems. They are sessile, the base of the leaves attach directly to the main stem rather than by a leaf stem, and are attached in pairs on opposite sides in an overlapping pattern. The succulent leaves are oval in shape, hairless except for small ones along the edges.

The particularly vivid red flowers crowd together in flat topped inflorescences at the ends of the stems. The flowers can be attached by short pedicels up to 1 cm long but can be shorter or even sessile like the leaves with the whole group as much as 8 cm across and with up to about 25 flowers. Each flower is 2–2.4 cm in diameter with five lobes and fused into a tube 3–3.5 cm long. The blooming season is in December through March in its native habitat.

It is very similar in appearance to Crassula fascicularis, but has red blooms and ovate-elliptic leaves where C. fascicularis has yellowish flowers and linear-lanceolate leaves.

== Taxonomy ==
Crassula coccinea was given its scientific name in 1753 by Carl Linnaeus. It is classified in the Crassula genus as part of the Crassulaceae family and has no accepted varieties, but has two among its 15 synonyms.

Table of Synonyms
Name	Year	Rank	Notes
Crassula coccinea var. alba (Haw.) J.M.H.Shaw	2024	variety	= het.
Crassula coccinea var. versicolor (Burch.) J.M.H.Shaw	2024	variety	= het.
Crassula versicolor Burch.	1818	species	= het.
Danielia coccinea (L.) Lem.	1869	species	≡ hom.
Danielia versicolor (Burch.) Lem.	1869	species	= het.
Dietrichia coccinea (L.) Tratt.	1812	species	≡ hom.
Dietrichia versicolor (Burch.) Eckl. & Zeyh.	1837	species	= het.
Kalosanthes coccinea (L.) Haw.	1821	species	≡ hom.
Kalosanthes coccinea var. alba Haw.	1821	variety	= het.
Kalosanthes splendens F.W.Sm.	1836	species	= het., without diagnostic descr.
Kalosanthes versicolor (Burch.) Haw.	1821	species	= het.
Larochea coccinea (L.) Pers.	1805	species	≡ hom.
Rochea coccinea (L.) DC.	1799	species	≡ hom.
Rochea versicolor (Burch.) Link	1821	species	= het.
Sedum rochea Kuntze	1898	species	≡ hom.
Notes: ≡ homotypic synonym; = heterotypic synonym

=== Names ===
The Botanical Latin species name, coccinea, means bright red and is derived from the Latin word coccum. Crassula coccinea is frequently known by the common name red crassula. It is also often called klipblom, but shares this name with species such as Crassula fascicularis. Likewise the uncommon name suikerblom is found in some sources, but the similar name rooi suikerblom is used for the distantly related Tylecodon grandiflorus. In gardening texts it is occasionally called rock flower, but this can also be applied to Colpias mollis which is also known as klipblom.

== Range and habitat ==
The natural range of the red crassula is in the Western Cape province of South Africa from the Cape Peninsula to Still Bay. It has also become naturalized in two areas of New Zealand, Rangitoto Island in the Auckland area and Camp Bay on the Banks Peninsula.

== Ecology ==
Red crassula is pollinated by the Table Mountain beauty butterfly (Aeropetes tulbaghia), which, usually for a butterfly, is attracted to red to orange colored flowers.

== Cultivation ==
Red crassula has been cultivated for more than three centuries. It is valued by gardeners both for the vivid color of its blooms and for ease of cultivation. Plants do require a sandy soil that is acidic and to be well watered during the local winter season.

The botanist and horticulturalist William Curtis wrote of the species in a publication issued in 1800 saying, "We have no doubt but that when this superb species of Crassula was first introduced from the Cape by Prof. Bradley, of Oxford in 1714, it was regarded as a kind of Merveil de la Nature; even now that it is common, we scarcely know any succulent that is superior to it, whether we regard its grandeur, the curious growth of its leaves, or the rich colour of its scarlet blossoms, readily produced on plants of a moderate size."
