= Pilipinas Climbing =

National sporting organisation

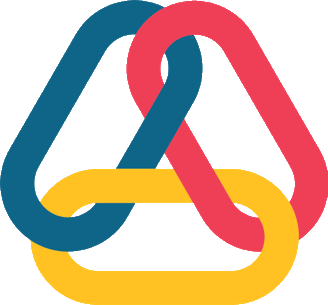
- Sport: Competition climbing
- Jurisdiction: Philippines
- Abbreviation: PCI
- Founded: 1998
- Affiliation: IFSC

Official website
- climbing.org.ph
- (Philippines)

Pilipinas Climbing Inc. is the national sports association of competition climbing in the Philippines

== History ==
Pilipinas Climbing was originally known as the Sport Climbing Association of the Philippines (SCAPI). It was established in September 1998.

SCAPI has been sending athletes at the X Games Asia since 1998.

SCAPI sent its first athletes to the SEA Games at the 2011 SEA Games in Indonesia. It also sent climbers at the 2018 Asian Games, also in Indonesia.

In 2023, SCAPI adopted its current name and became a full member of the International Federation of Sport Climbing (IFSC) after having been a continental member. As of 2025, Pilipinas Climbing is yet to become a regular member of the Philippine Olympic Committee and the state-run Philippine Sports Commission.
