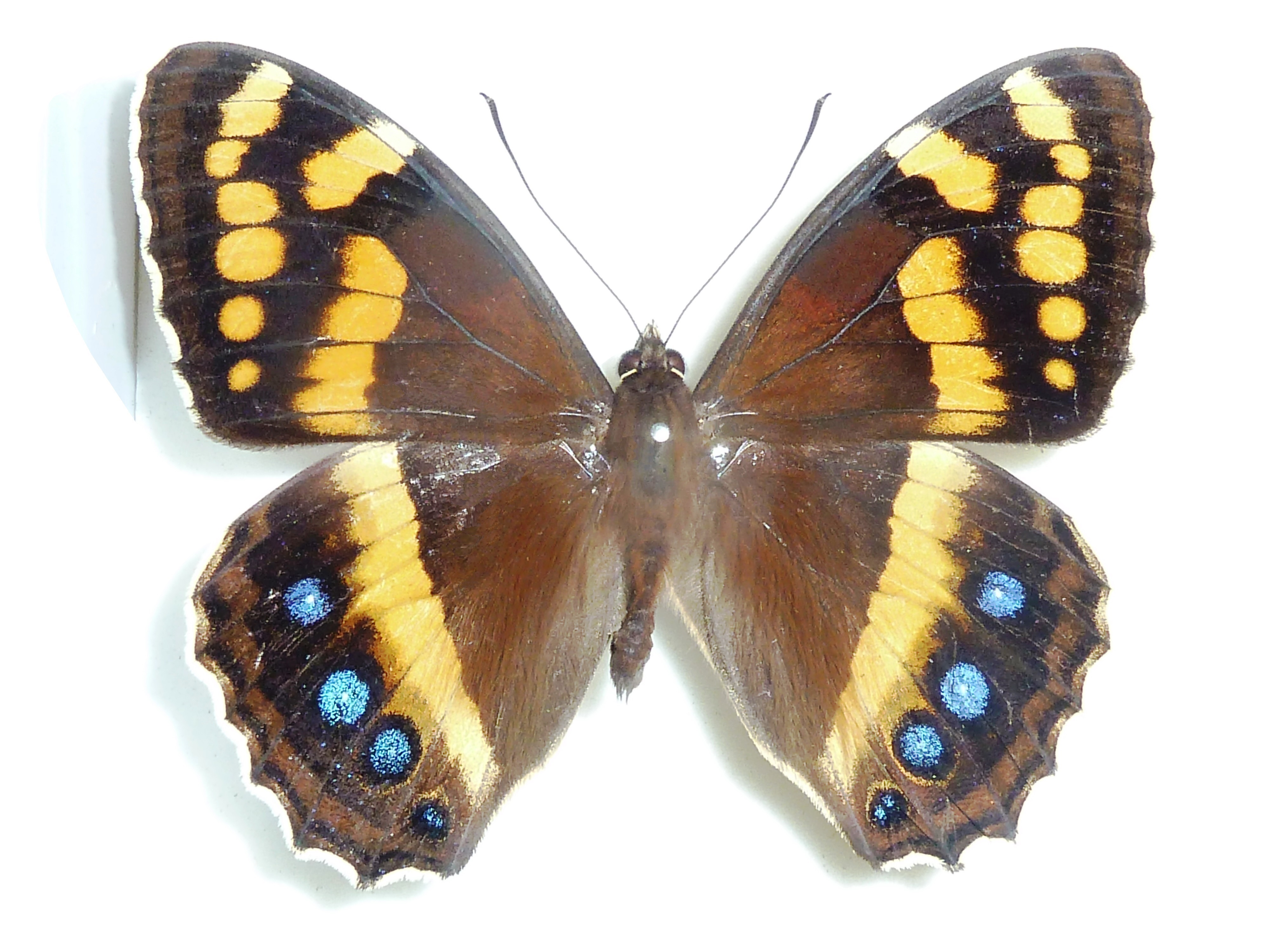

Conservation status
- Least Concern (IUCN 3.1)

Scientific classification
- Kingdom: Animalia
- Phylum: Arthropoda
- Clade: Pancrustacea
- Class: Insecta
- Order: Lepidoptera
- Family: Nymphalidae
- Subfamily: Satyrinae
- Tribe: Dirini
- Genus: Aeropetes; Billberg, 1820
- Species: A. tulbaghia

Binomial name
- Aeropetes tulbaghia (Linnaeus, 1764)
- Range across South Africa, Lesotho and Eswatini (also in eastern Zimbabwe)

Synonyms
- (Genus) Meneris Doubleday, 1844; (Species) Papilio tulbaghia Linnaeus, 1764; (Species) Meneris tulbaghia (Linnaeus, 1764)

= Aeropetes =

Mountain pride

Genus of butterflies

Aeropetes is a monotypic butterfly genus in the family Nymphalidae. Its only species, Aeropetes tulbaghia, is commonly known as the Table Mountain beauty or mountain pride. It is native to southern Africa, where it occurs in South Africa, Lesotho, Eswatini and Zimbabwe.

== Etymology ==
Linnaeus chose the specific name to commemorate Ryk Tulbagh, from whom he received batches of Cape specimens, collected by Tulbagh's gardener, J. A. Auge. Billberg established the genus in 1820, Aero- (from ἀήρ, aēr) meaning "air", "atmosphere" or (in earlier Greek) "mist", and -petes (from πέτης, pétēs) meaning "one who flies" or "flyer".

== Description ==
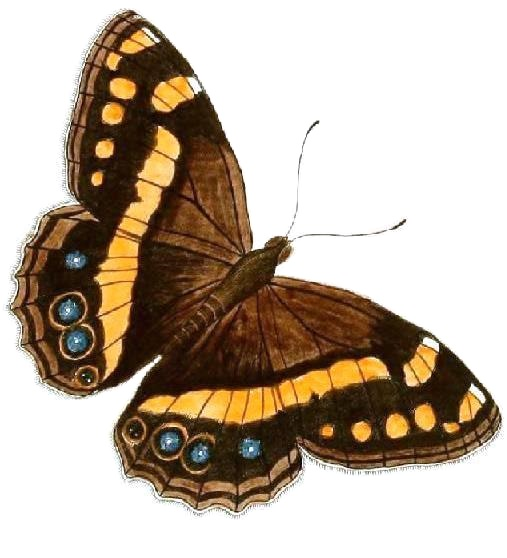
Upperside

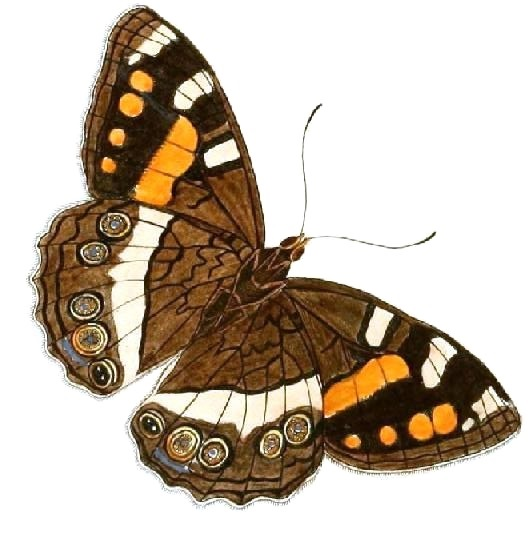
Underside

The sexes are similar, but males are on average smaller. The wingspan is 70–78 mm for males and 75–90 mm for females.

== Habitat and habits ==
Aeropetes is commonly found in mountainous, rock-strewn hillsides and gullies. It has a tendency to settle on the shady side of rocks and of overhung stream banks.

== Biology ==
The larvae feed on various Poaceae species, including Ehrharta erecta, Hyparrhenia hirta and Pennisetum clandestinum. The adults are fond of red or orange flowers, and it is the only pollinator of the orchids Disa uniflora and Disa ferruginea. There is one generation per year.

Adults are on the wing during the austral summer, from November to April (with peaks from December to March).

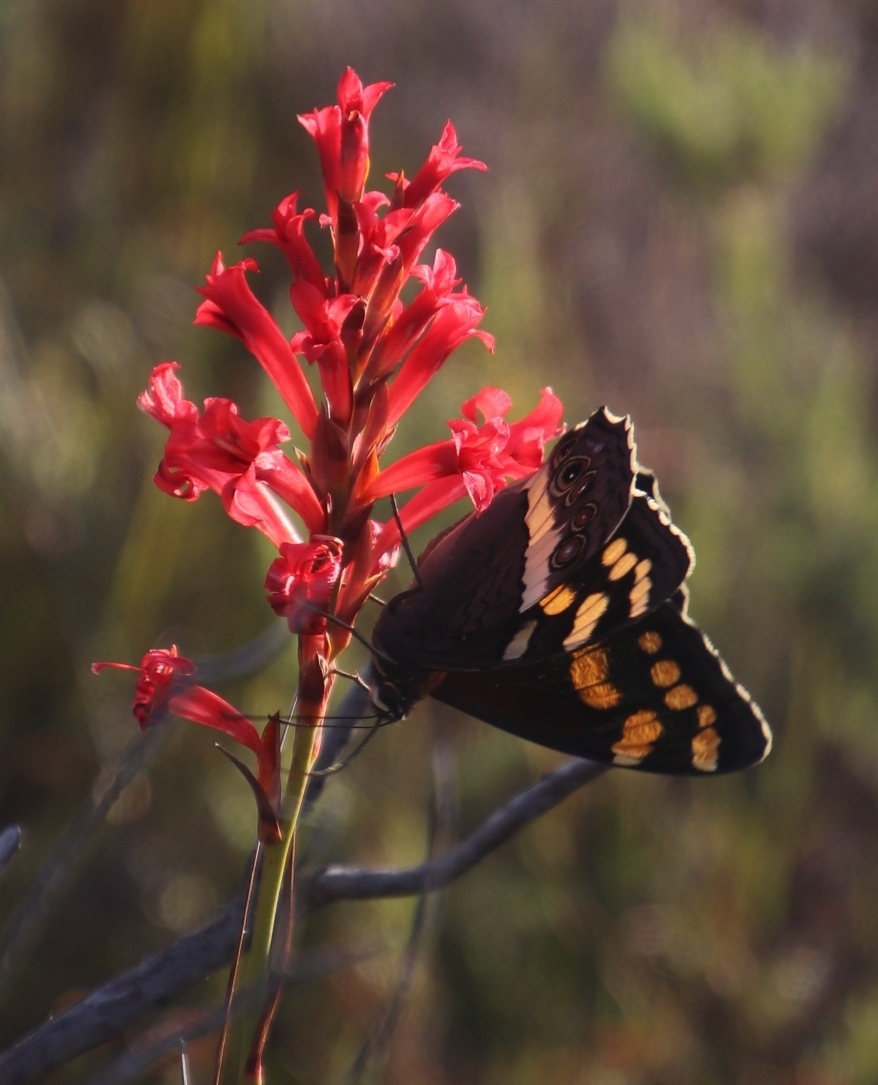
Feeding at the flowers of an orchid species in Table Mountain NP

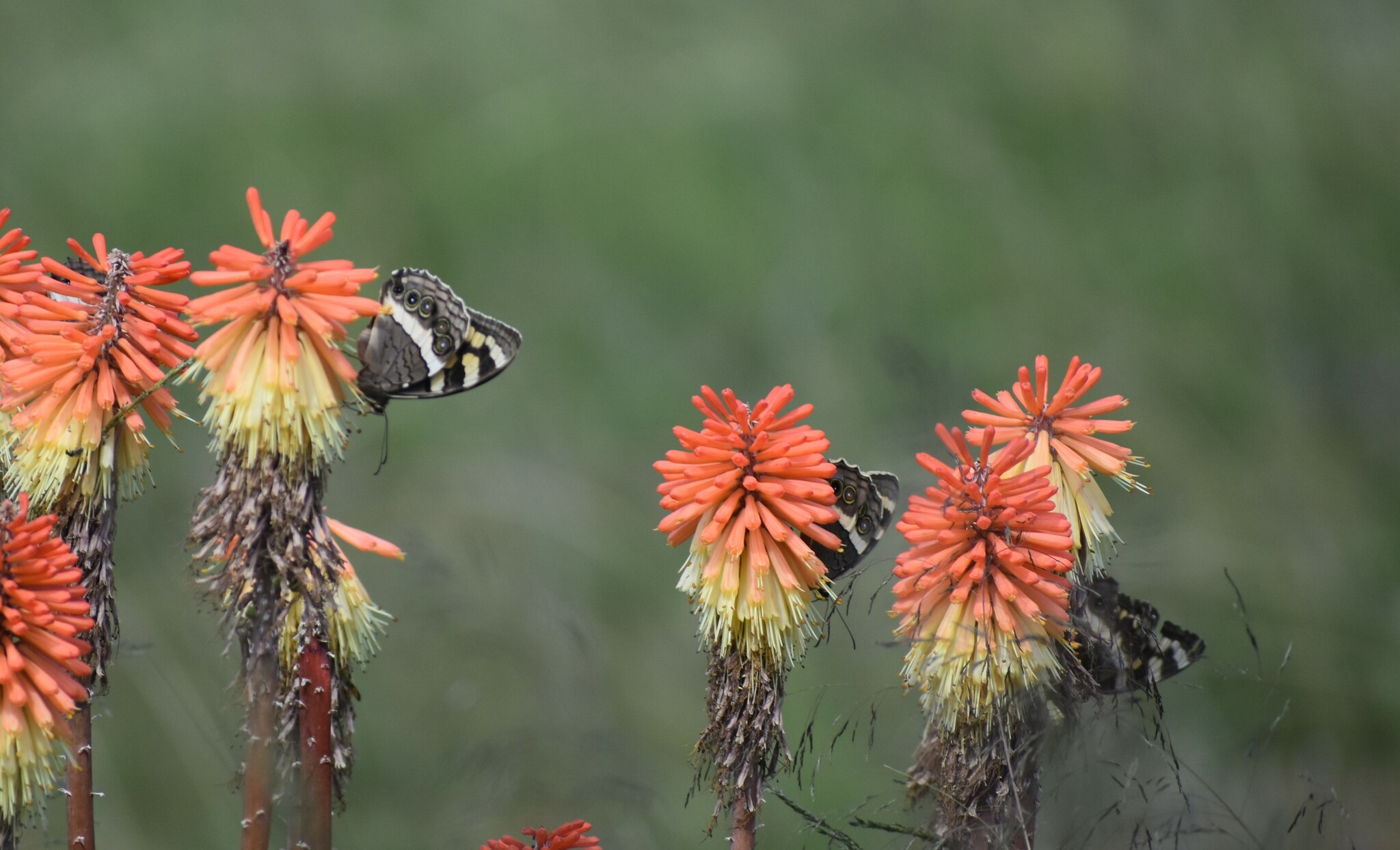
Assembled at the inflorescences of torch lilies in Lesotho

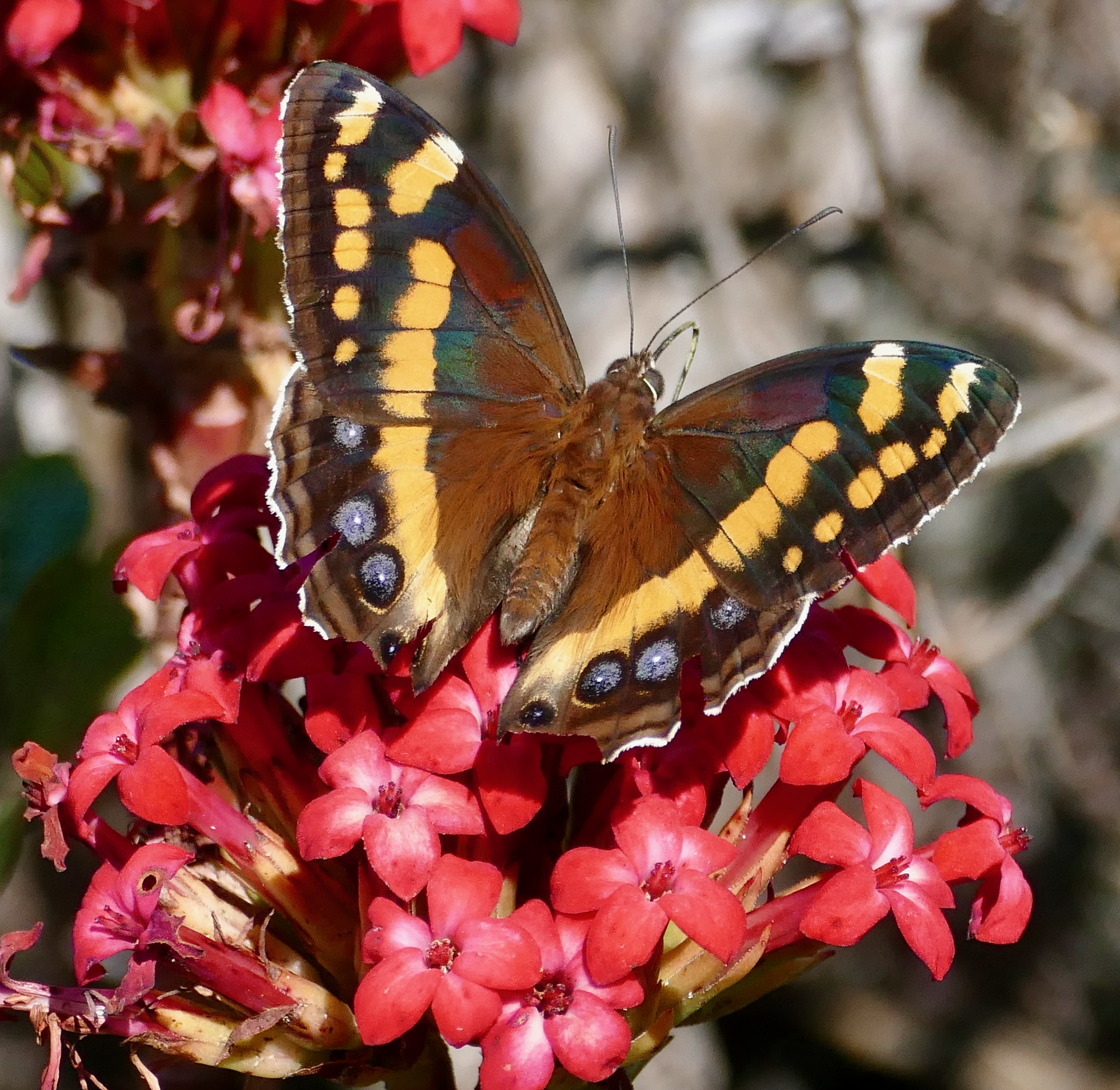
Feeding on red crassula flowers on Table Mountain plateau, Cape Town

== Range ==
The butterfly is found throughout the fynbos bio-region of South Africa, besides parts of the Nama Karoo and grassland areas in the Western and Northern Cape, Free State and Gauteng provinces of South Africa. It occurs fairly commonly along the mountain ranges of the Great Escarpment and Eastern Highlands, which includes parts of the Western and Eastern Cape, Lesotho, KwaZulu-Natal, Eswatini, Mpumalanga, Limpopo, and eastern Zimbabwe.
