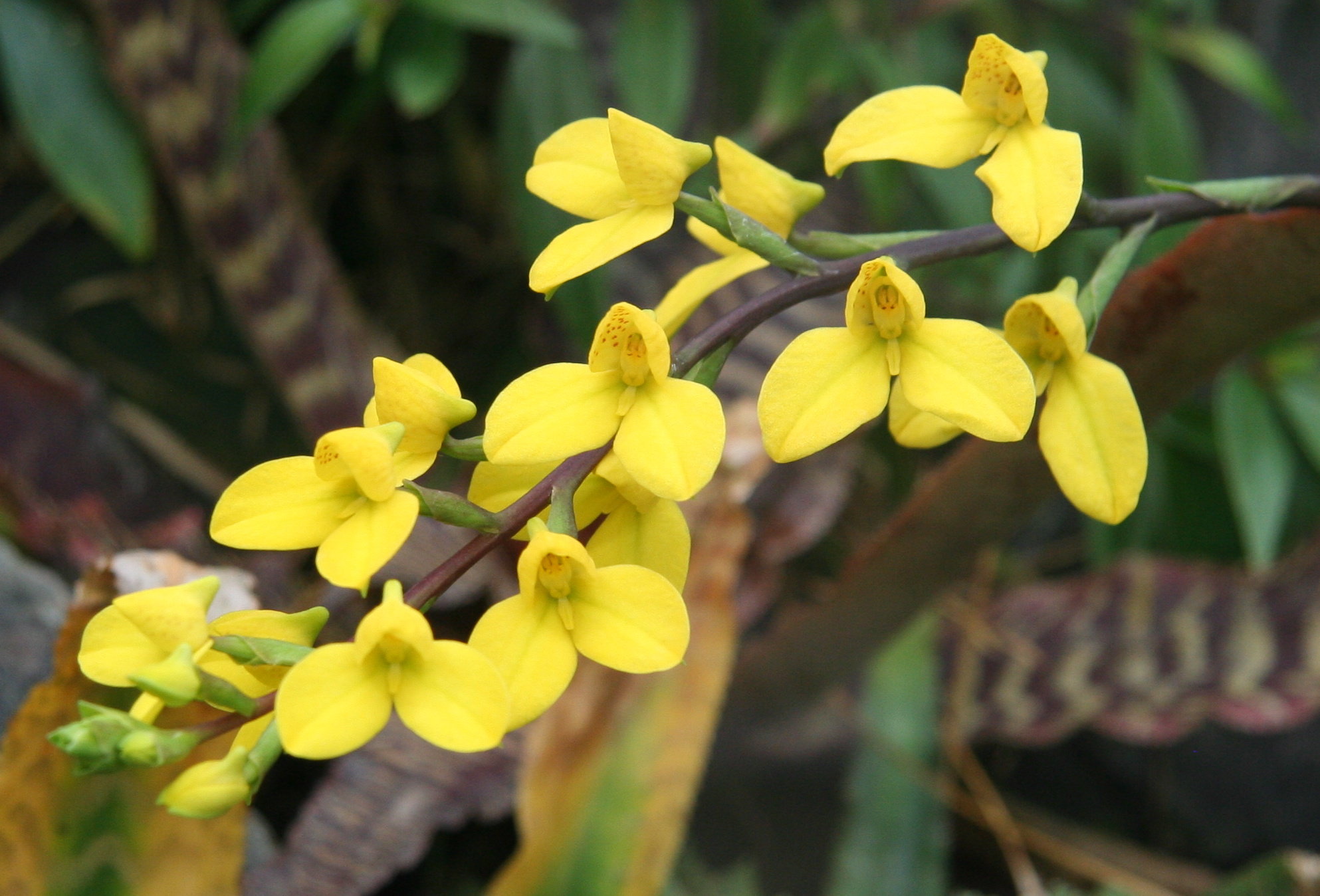

Scientific classification
- Kingdom: Plantae
- Clade: Embryophytes
- Clade: Tracheophytes
- Clade: Spermatophytes
- Clade: Angiosperms
- Clade: Monocots
- Order: Asparagales
- Family: Orchidaceae
- Subfamily: Orchidoideae
- Genus: Disa
- Species: D. aurata

Binomial name
- Disa aurata (Bolus) L.T.Parker & Koop. 1993

Synonyms
- Disa tripetaloides subsp. aurata (Bolus) H.P.Linder 1981; Disa tripetaloides var. aurata Bolus 1893

= Disa aurata =

Species of flowering plant in the orchid family

Disa aurata is a species of orchid found in Swellendam area of Cape Province, South Africa at elevations of 0 to 1,000 meters (3,300 ft).
