= World Climbing =

Governing body for competition climbing

- Abbreviation: WC
- Formation: 27 January 2007; 19 years ago
- Founded at: Frankfurt, Germany
- Type: Sports federation
- Headquarters: Turin, Italy
- Members: 98 member federations
- President: Marco Maria Scolaris
- Website: worldclimbing.com
- Formerly called: International Federation of Sport Climbing (IFSC)

World Climbing (formerly known as the International Federation of Sport Climbing or IFSC) is the international governing body for the sport of competition climbing, which consists of the disciplines lead climbing, bouldering, and speed climbing.

The federation officially launched the name World Climbing on 10 December 2025, following approval by its National Federations and subsequent amendment of its statutes in October 2023.

== Charter ==
World Climbing describes itself as "the international federation responsible for all aspects of international competition climbing and is the final authority for all matters concerning international competition climbing". It describes itself as responsible for all technical aspects of the sport of competition climbing, for the approval of all member federations and their respective competitions, and of approving the calendar and schedule of events held during the year. World Climbing is recognised by the International Olympic Committee.

== History ==
The IFSC was founded in Frankfurt on 27 January 2007 by 57 member federations as a continuation of the International Council for Competition Climbing, which had been in existence from 1997 to 2007 under the governance of the Union Internationale des Associations d'Alpinisme (UIAA). Later that year, the IFSC was granted provisional recognition by the IOC, and consisted of 80 member federations. On 10 February 2010, the IOC granted the IFSC formal recognition, and on 4 July 2011, the IOC added climbing to a shortlist of potential new sports for the 2020 Tokyo Olympic Games, which was confirmed in 2016.

Due to the 2022 Russian invasion of Ukraine, the IFSC suspended the Russian and Belarusian federations and canceled all events in Russia in 2022.

== Competitions ==
The major competitions organized by World Climbing are:

=== World Climbing Series ===
The World Climbing Series is a series of competitions held annually. The athletes compete in three disciplines: lead, bouldering, and speed. The number of competitions and venues vary from year to year. Before 2026, World Climbing Series were known as World Cups, the first of which was held under the auspices of UIAA in 1989, featuring speed and lead disciplines. Bouldering was not added as a discipline until 1999. World Cups were held under the auspices of IFSC from 2007 until 2026, when the name was changed to World Climbing.

=== World Climbing Championship ===
The World Climbing Championship is a competition held biennially. This event determines the male and female world champions in the disciplines of sport climbing lead, bouldering and speed as well as in para-climbing. The World Climbing Championship was founded as the World Championship in 1991 and the first edition was held in Frankfurt, Germany.

=== World Climbing Youth Championship ===
The World Climbing Youth Championship is a competition held annually. This event determines the male and female world youth champions in three disciplines: lead, speed, and bouldering. For each discipline, the athletes are grouped in three age groups: Youth B, Youth A and Juniors. The World Climbing Youth Championship was founded as the Youth World Championship in 1992, and the first edition was hosted in Basel, Switzerland.

=== World Climbing Europe Championship ===
The World Climbing Europe Championship is a competition held biennially in years when World Climbing Championships are not held. This event determines the male and female European champions in the three disciplines of sport climbing lead, bouldering, and speed.

=== World Climbing Europe Youth Series ===
The World Climbing Europe Youth Series is a series of competitions held annually. Athletes compete in three disciplines: lead, speed, and bouldering and are grouped into three age groups: Youth B, Youth A, and Juniors.

== Presidents ==
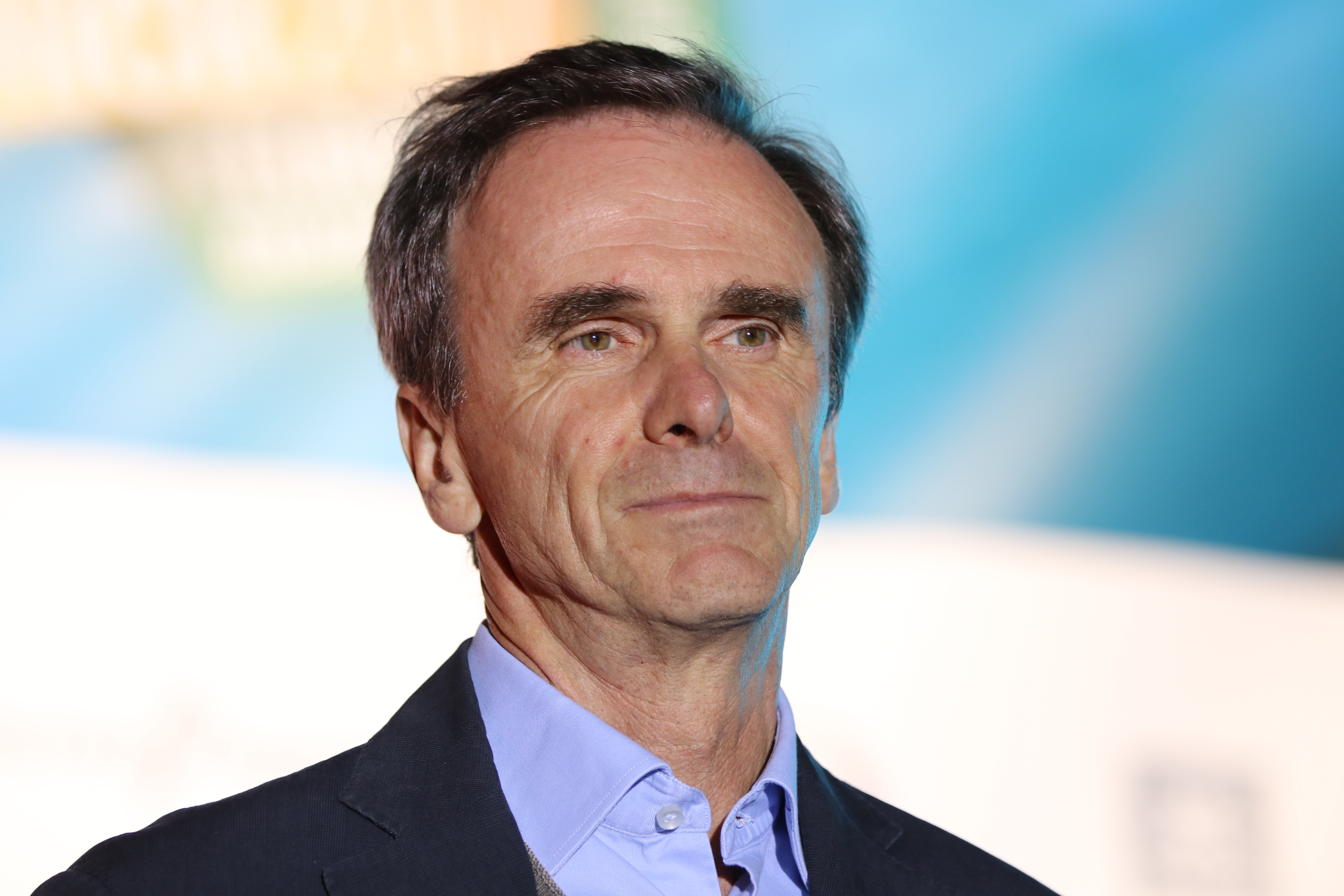
Marco Scolaris, President of the IFSC, in 2017

- 2007- : Marco Maria Scolaris

== Members ==
In the following tables are listed the members of the national federations:

=== Full members ===
Country	Federation	Acronym
Argentina	Federación Argentina de Ski y Andinismo	FASA
Australia	Sport Climbing Australia	SCA
Austria	Kletterverband Österreich	KVÖ
Azerbaijan	Air and Extreme Sports Federation of Azerbaijan	FAIREX
Belgium	Climbing and Mountaineering Belgium	CMBEL
Bolivia	Federación Boliviana de Ski y Andinismo	FEBSA
Brazil	Associação Brasileira de Escalada Esportiva	ABEE
Bulgaria	Bulgarian Climbing and Mountaineering Federation	BCMF
Cameroon	Association des Sport de Montagne et d'Escalade	ASME
Canada	Climbing Escalade Canada	CEC
Chile	Federación de Andinismo de Chile	FEACH
China	Chinese Mountaineering Association	CMA
Chinese Taipei	Chinese Taipei Alpine Association	CTAA
Colombia	Federación Colombiana de Escalada Deportiva	FCED
Costa Rica	Federación costarricense de Deportes de Montaña	FECODEM
Croatia	Hrvatski Planinarski Savez (Croatian Mountaineering Association)	HPS
Cyprus	Cyprus Mountaineering and Climbing Federation	CMCF
Czech Republic	Cesky horolezecky svaz (Czech mountaineering association)	CHS
Denmark	Dansk Klatreforbund/Danish Climbing Federation	DKF/DCF
Ecuador	Federación Ecuatoriana de Andinismo y Escalada	FEDAN
El Salvador	Federación Salvadoreña de montañismo y escalada	FSME
Finland	Finnish Climbing association	FCA
France	Fédération française de la montagne et de l'escalade	FFME
Georgia	Georgian Climbing National Federation	GCNF
Germany	Deutscher Alpenverein	DAV
Great Britain	British Mountaineering Council	BMC
Greece	Hellenic Federation of Mountaineering and Climbing	HFMCU (EOOA)
Guatemala	Federación Nacional de Andinismo de Guatemala	FNAG
Honduras	Federación Hondurena de Deportes de Montana y Escalada	FEHDME
Hong Kong	Hong Kong Mountaineering Union	HKMU
Hungary	Hungarian Mountaineering and Sport Climbing Federation	MHSSz
India	Indian Mountaineering Foundation	IMF
Indonesia	Federasi Panjat Tebing Indonesia	FPTI
Iran	Iran Mountaineering and Sport Climbing Federation	IRI MF
Ireland	Mountaineering Ireland	MI
Israel	Israel Climbers' Club	ILCC
Italy	Federazione Arrampicata Sportiva Italiana	FASI
Japan	Japan Mountaineering and Sport Climbing Association	JMSCA
Kazakhstan	Mountaineering and Climbing Federation of Republic of Kazakhstan	MCFRK
Latvia	Latvian Alpinist Association	LAA
Lithuania	Lithuania Federation of Sport Climbing	LFSC
Luxembourg	Fédération Luxembourgeoise d'Escalade, de Randonnée et d'Alpinisme	FLERA
Malaysia	Persekutuan Mendaki Malaysia (Malaysia Mountaineering Federation)	PMM
Malta	Malta Sport for All	MSFA
Mauritius	Mauritius Sport Climbing Federation	MSCF
Mexico	Federación Mexicana de Deportes de Montana Y Escalada	FMDMYE
Mongolia	Mongolian National Climbing Federation	MNCF
Nepal	Nepal Mountaineering Association	NMA
Netherlands	Koninklijke Nederlandse Klim- en Bergsportvereniging	NKBV
New Zealand	Climbing New Zealand	CNZ
North Macedonia	Macedonian Sport Climbing Federation	MSCF
Norway	The Norwegian Climbing Federation	NCF
Pakistan	Alpine Club of Pakistan	ACP
Panama	Asociación Panameña de Escalada	APAES
Peru	Federación Deportiva Peruana de Escalada	FEDPE
Philippines	Pilipinas Climbing	PCI
Poland	Polski Zwiazek Alpinizmu (Polish Mountaineering Association)	PZA
Portugal	Federação Portuguesa de Montanhismo e Escalada / Portuguese Mountaineering and Climbing Federation	FPME
Romania	Federația Română de Alpinism și Escaladă	FRAE
Russia	Climbing Federation of Russia (suspended)	CFR
Saudi Arabia	The Saudi Climbing and Hiking Federation	SCHF
Serbia	United Sport Climbing Federation of Serbia	USCFS
Singapore	Singapore Mountaineering Federation	SMF
Slovakia	Slovak Mountaineering Union JAMES	SMU JAMES
Slovenia	Alpine Association of Slovenia	PZS
South Korea	Korean Alpine Federation	KAF
Spain	Federación Española de Deportes de Montaña y Escalada	FEDME
South Africa	South African National Climbing Federation	SANCF
Sweden	Swedish Climbing Federation	SKF
Switzerland	Swiss Alpine Club	CAS
Thailand	The Sport Climbing Association of Thailand	SCAT
Turkey	Turkish Mountaineering Federation	TDF/TMF
Ukraine	Ukrainian Mountaineering and Climbing Federation	UMF
USA	USA Climbing	USAC
Venezuela	Federación Venezolana de Escalada Deportiva	FEVME

=== Continental members ===
Country	Federation	Acronym
Algeria	Fédération Algérienne de Ski et sports de Montagne	FASSM
Andorra	Federacio Andorrana de Muntanyisme	FAM
Armenia	Armenia Alpine Club	AAC
Belarus	Belarus Alpine Federation (suspended)	BAF
Bosnia and Herzegovina	Mountaineering Union of Bosnia - Herzegovina	PSBIH
Cambodia	Cambodia Climbing Federation	CCD
Estonia	Estonian Climbing Association	ECA
Fiji	Sport Climbing Fiji	SCF
Jordan	Jordan Federation of Sport Climbing	JFSC
Kyrgyzstan	Federation of Mountaineering Rock and Ice Climbing of Kirgiz Republic	FMRICK
Macau	Mountaineering Federation Macau China	MFMC
Rwanda	Rwanda Sports Climbing Federation	RSCF
Sri Lanka	National Association for Climbing and Mountaineering in Sri Lanka	NACMSL
Uganda	Uganda Sport Climbing Federation	USCF
Uzbekistan	Federation of Mountaineering and Rock Climbing of Uzbekistan	FMCU

=== Regional ===
Country	Federation	Acronym
New Caledonia	Comité Régional de la Montagne et de l'Escalade de la Nouvelle Calédonie	

=== Observers ===
Country	Federation	Acronym
Austria	Austrian Alpine Club	ÖAV
Spain	Basque Mountaineering Federation (Eusko Mendizale Federazioa)	EMF
Spain	Federació d'Entitats Excursionistes de Catalunya	FEEC

== See also ==
- World Climbing Championship
- World Climbing Series
- World Climbing Europe Championship
- Paraclimbing
