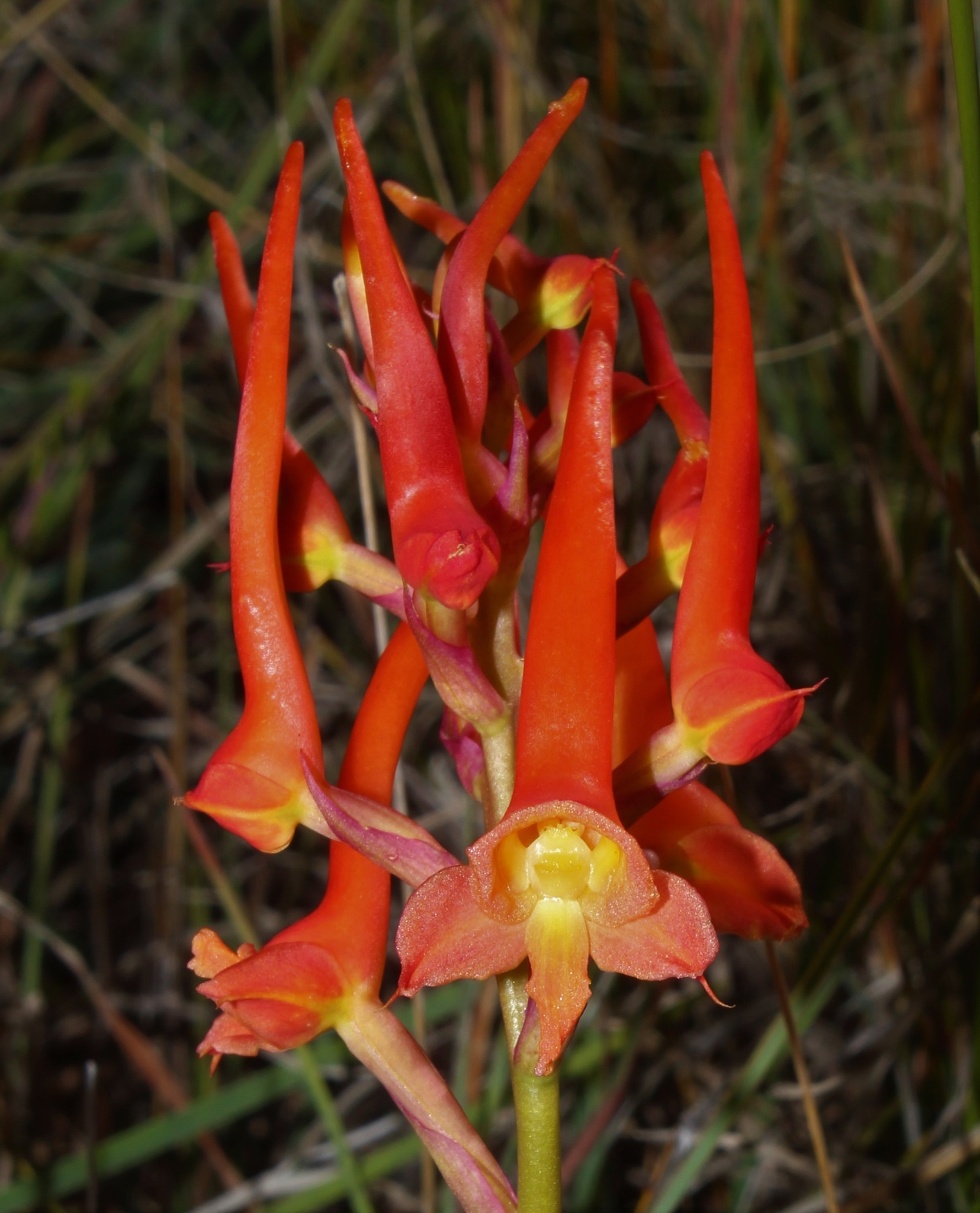

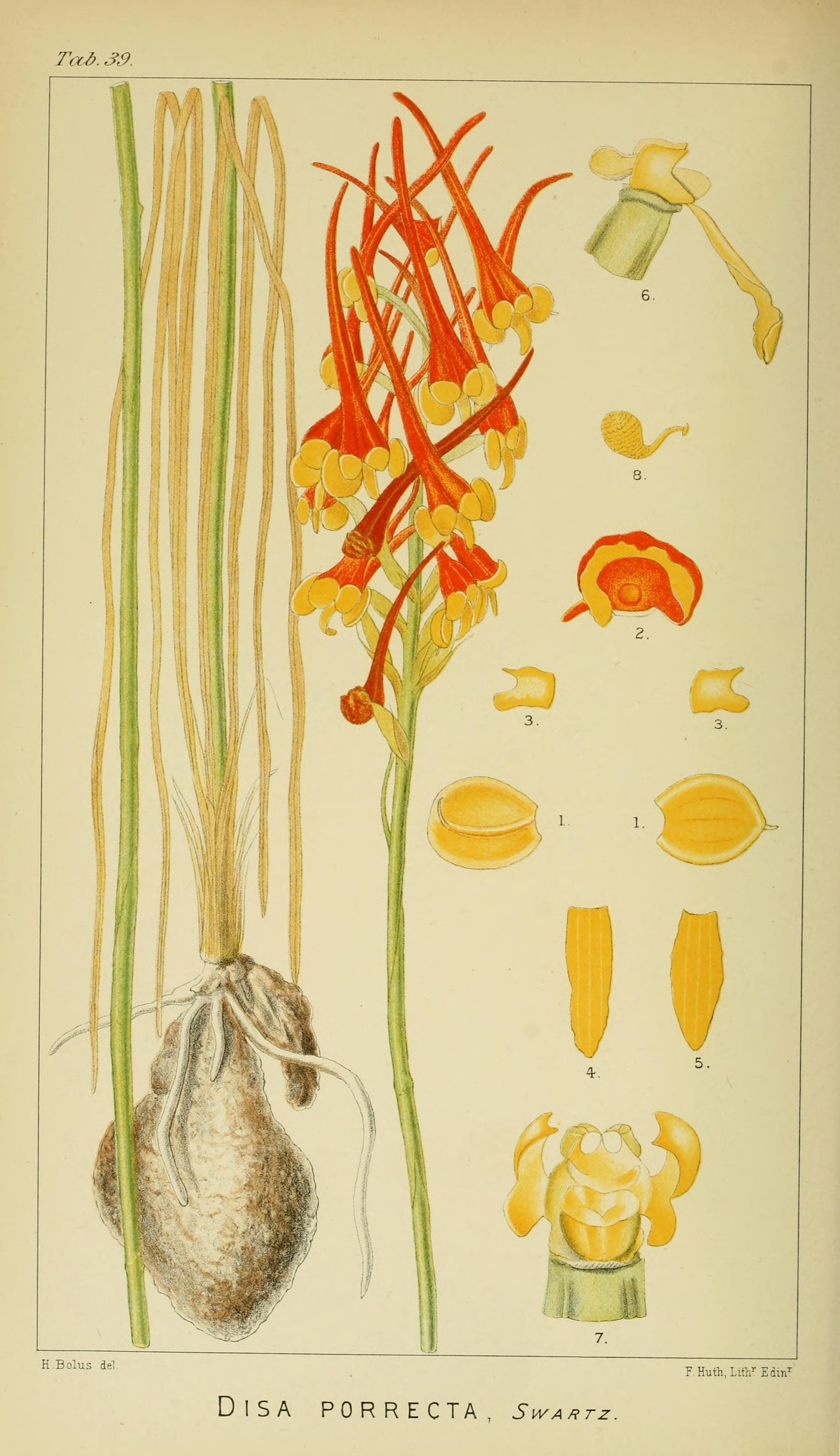

Scientific classification
- Kingdom: Plantae
- Clade: Tracheophytes
- Clade: Angiosperms
- Clade: Monocots
- Order: Asparagales
- Family: Orchidaceae
- Subfamily: Orchidoideae
- Genus: Disa
- Species: D. porrecta

Binomial name
- Disa porrecta Sw.

Synonyms
- Disa zeyheri Sond.

= Disa porrecta =

Species of flowering plant

Disa porrecta, commonly known as the rocket orchid or lekholela, is a perennial plant and geophyte belonging to the genus Disa. The plant is native to Lesotho, the Eastern Cape and the Free State.
