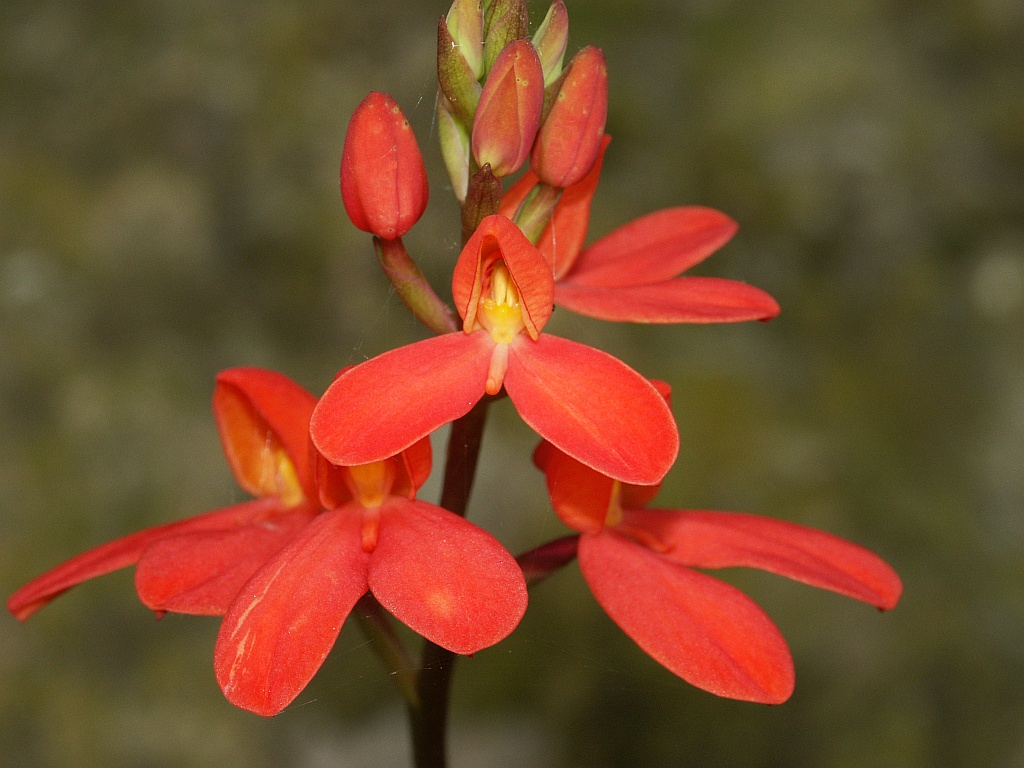

Scientific classification
- Kingdom: Plantae
- Clade: Embryophytes
- Clade: Tracheophytes
- Clade: Spermatophytes
- Clade: Angiosperms
- Clade: Monocots
- Order: Asparagales
- Family: Orchidaceae
- Subfamily: Orchidoideae
- Genus: Disa
- Species: D. cardinalis

Binomial name
- Disa cardinalis H.P. Linder

= Disa cardinalis =

Species of flowering plant in the orchid family

Disa cardinalis is a species of orchid found in South Africa (S. Cape Prov. - Riversdale).
