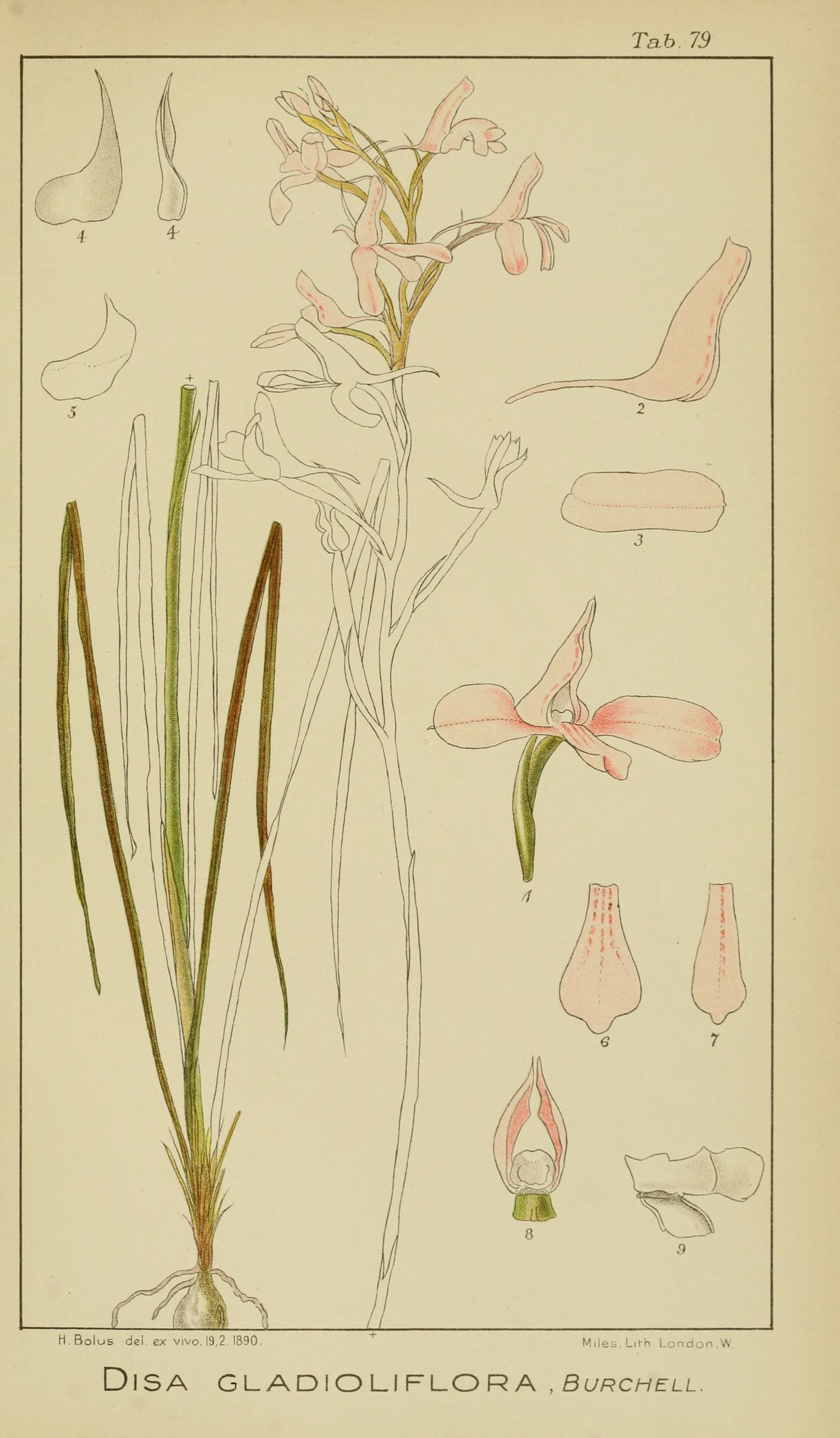

Scientific classification
- Kingdom: Plantae
- Clade: Tracheophytes
- Clade: Angiosperms
- Clade: Monocots
- Order: Asparagales
- Family: Orchidaceae
- Subfamily: Orchidoideae
- Genus: Disa
- Species: D. gladioliflora

Binomial name
- Disa gladioliflora Burch. ex Lindl.

= Disa gladioliflora =

Species of flowering plant

Disa gladioliflora is a perennial plant and geophyte belonging to the genus Disa and is part of the fynbos. The plant is endemic to the Eastern Cape and Western Cape.

There are two subspecies:

- Disa gladioliflora subsp. capricornis (Rchb.f.) H.P.Linder
- Disa gladioliflora subsp. gladioliflora
