= The Mountain Club of South Africa =

Club facilitating mountaineering, search and rescue and conservation

The Mountain Club of South Africa MCSA
- Sport: Mountaineering
- Official website: www.mcsa.org.za

History
- Year of formation: 1891

Affiliations
- International federation: International Climbing and Mountaineering Federation (UIAA)

Elected
- President: Paul Carstensen
- Address: 97 Hatfield St; Cape Town
- Country: South Africa

The Mountain Club of South Africa (MCSA) is the largest and oldest mountaineering club in South Africa. It facilitates and engages in mountaineering, climbing of all types, bouldering, hiking, international expeditions, mountain search and rescue, training, conservation of mountain areas, and procurement of access for mountaineering.

== History ==
The MCSA was founded in 1891 and hence is one of the oldest mountaineering clubs in the world. Since its establishment, the MCSA has been embedded with and reflected, the political ideology and interests of the social and governing class during the colonial and segregation eras. This situation prevailed for most of the apartheid era, when the club finally opened its membership to all, regardless of race and the first black member was admitted in 1986. The MCSA is the only mountain club in Africa affiliated with the world mountaineering body, the UIAA. Members of the MCSA have climbed and hiked on all the major mountain ranges throughout the world. Since its inception, the MCSA has published an annual journal. The MCSA Journal is one of the oldest mountain club journals still being published on an annual basis.

The club consists of 14 sections spread over South Africa and Namibia and with more than 4000 members.

- Amajuba
- Cape Town
- Eastern Province
- Free State
- Hottentots Holland
- Johannesburg
- KwaZulu-Natal
- Magaliesberg (also known as the Pretoria section)
- Namibia
- Paarl/Wellington
- South Cape
- Stellenbosch
- Tygerberg
- Worcester

The objectives of the Mountain Club of South Africa are to further the interests of mountaineering in South Africa and elsewhere, and in doing so inter alia to:

- Organise and facilitate mountaineering
- Procure and protect real rights in and access to mountains and mountain areas
- Initiate and support actions towards protecting the natural beauty and wilderness character of mountains and to promote their effective conservation management
- Promote the safety and training of mountaineers
- Provide search and rescue resources
- Promote the study of mountains and their environments, the preservation of historical and archaeological sites on them and the dissemination of information on mountains and mountaineering.

== Notable members ==
- Keppel Harcourt Barnard
- Elsie Elizabeth Esterhuysen
- Johannes de Villiers Graaff
- Rudolf Marloth
- Cathy O'Dowd
- Edwin Percy Phillips
- Marianne Pretorius
- Jan Smuts
- Cecil John Rodes

== See also ==
- South African National Climbing Federation
