= Rudolf Marloth =

South African botanist, pharmacist and chemist

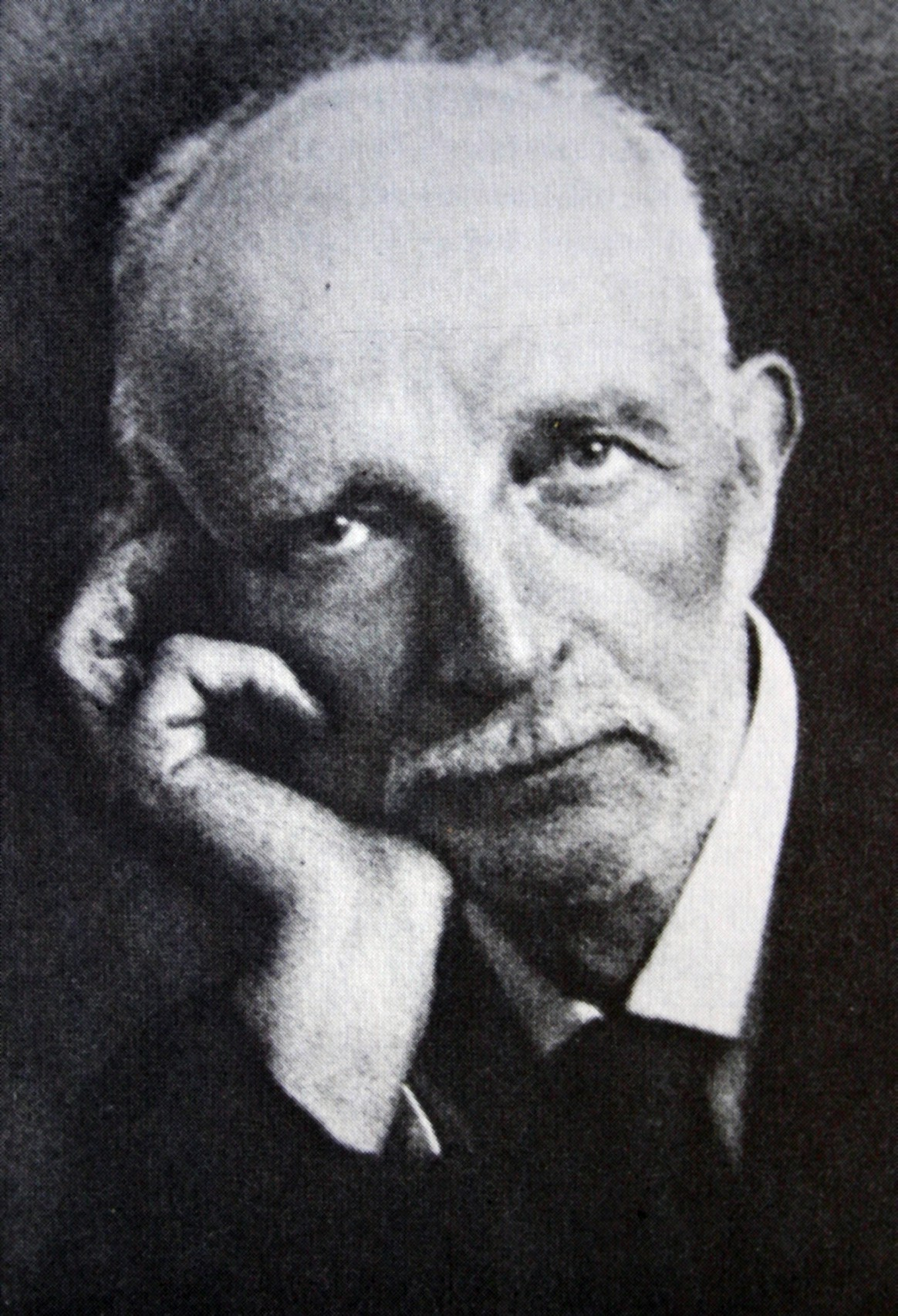
- Born: 28 December 1855; Lübben, Brandenburg, Kingdom of Prussia
- Died: 15 May 1931 (aged 75); Caledon, Cape Province
- Education: University of Berlin
- Scientific career
- Fields: Botanist, Pharmacist and Analytical Chemist
- Thesis: "The protective mechanisms employed by seeds against harmful agents"
- Author abbrev. (botany): Marloth

Hermann Wilhelm Rudolf Marloth (28 December 1855 Lübben, Germany – 15 May 1931 Caledon, Cape Province) was a German-born South African botanist, pharmacist and analytical chemist, best known for his Flora of South Africa which appeared in six superbly illustrated volumes between 1913 and 1932. This botanist is denoted by the author abbreviation Marloth when citing a botanical name.

== Biography ==
=== Early life ===
Marloth studied pharmacy in Lübben from 1873 to 1876. After which he worked at various pharmacies in Germany and Switzerland, then formally qualified as a pharmacist at the University of Berlin. In 1883 he was awarded a doctorate for his thesis "The protective mechanisms employed by seeds against harmful agents".

He arrived in Cape Town on 30 December 1883 after being urged to do so by a schoolfriend who had already settled there. During his first year there he worked as a pharmacist for the firm of Wentzel and Schleswig. He was enthralled by Cape Town and Table Mountain and started immediately on a plant collection, soon going further afield to places like Klein Winterhoek, Du Toitskloof, Bainskloof and Sneeukop. During this time he started his own business in Cape Town. Acting as a locum in Kimberley, he made collecting trips from 1885-1886 to the surrounding areas such as Kuruman in the Northern Cape and to South West Africa where he visited Aus, Lüderitz Bay, Walvis Bay, Usakos, Ubib, Karibib, Otjimbingwe and Okahandja. He issued and distributed the exsiccata-like specimen series Exsiccata austro-africana. Many of his specimens were written up under "Plantae Marlothiana" by Engler and others in Berlin.

In 1888 he accepted a post in the Department of Chemistry at Victoria College (which later became Stellenbosch University); shortly after this in 1889 he became Professor and held this position till 1892. Thereafter he lectured at Elsenburg Agricultural School and at the same time acted as consultant and analytical chemist in Cape Town.

=== Later life ===
In 1891 he married Marian van Wyk of Clanwilliam.

The day after he arrived in Cape Town, he had climbed to the top of Table Mountain. Spending much time botanising in the mountains, he came into contact with the mountaineering fraternity and played a role in the founding of the Mountain Club of South Africa in 1891, acting as chairman from 1901-1906 and receiving their gold badge in 1906. He spent time on the Groot Winterhoek Peak near Tulbagh, Michells Pass and collected at Stellenbosch, Knysna, Matroosberg and Jonkershoek between 1887 and 1896. During this period he discovered many new species and a new genus in Gesneriaceae which he named Charadrophila Marl.

In 1898 he met Andreas Schimper, renowned botanist and phytogeographer, who had arrived aboard the "Valdivia". Together they made collecting trips to the Montagu and Swartberg passes, and then further to Knysna. Schimper died in 1901 before his report was written, so Marloth was asked to write an account on the phytogeography of the Cape. In those times "the Cape" was interpreted to cover a large part of southern Africa. To write the report, Marloth felt it necessary to make extended trips to the Cederberg, Gifberg, Koue Bokkeveld, Swartruggens and on to Rhodesia.

On a visit to South Africa in 1905, Lady Phillips commissioned Rudolf Marloth to undertake his Flora of South Africa, a mammoth work published in 6 volumes between 1913 and 1932. In 1917 a Dictionary of the Common Names of Plants was published - this was a supplement to the Flora of South Africa. Other publications by Marloth were Cape Flowers at home (Darter, Cape Town, 1922), The Chemistry of South African Plants and Plant Products (Cape Chemical Society, Cape Town, 1913), Das Kapland:insonderheit das Reich der Kapflora, das Waldgebiet und die Karroo, pflanzengeographisch dargestellt (Gustav Fischer, Jena, 1908) and Stone-shaped Plants (Speciality Press, Cape Town, 1929)

2 genera of flowering plants have been named in his honour, in 1912 Marlothiella from Namibia, belonging to the family Apiaceae, then in 1928 Marlothistella from South Africa, belonging to the family Aizoaceae. Species Aloe marlothii was also named in Marloth's honour.

An important nature reserve and holiday township in Mpumalanga, Marloth Park, is also named after this famous botanist, besides the Marloth Nature Reserve in the Western Cape.

== Bibliography ==
- R.H.C. (1931). "Rudolf Marloth" (Obituary). Journal of the Botanical Society of South Africa. 17 (3216): 18. Bibcode:1931Natur.127..945A. doi:10.1038/127945a0. S2CID 26587770.
