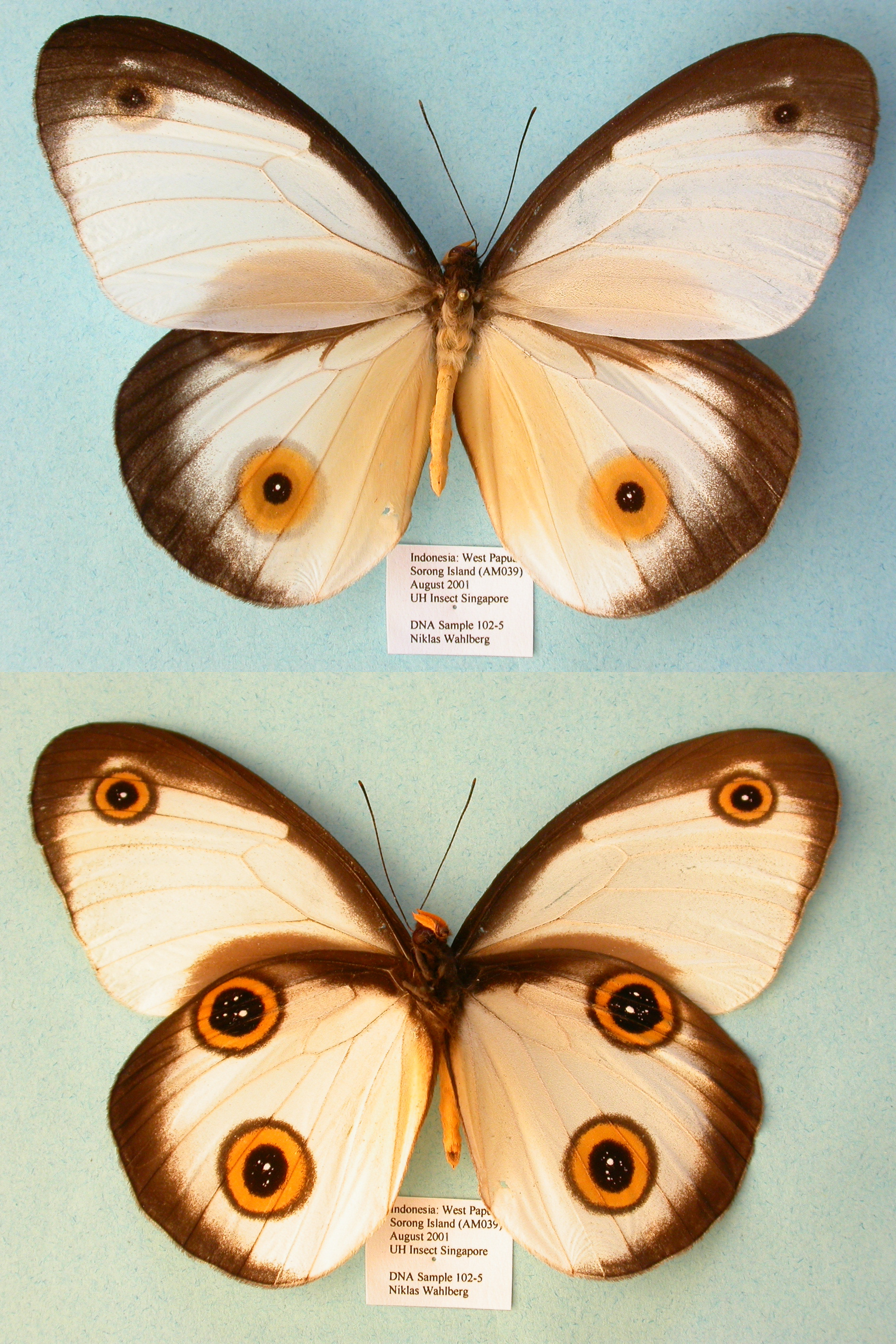
- Hyantis hodeva helvola

Scientific classification
- Kingdom: Animalia
- Phylum: Arthropoda
- Clade: Pancrustacea
- Class: Insecta
- Order: Lepidoptera
- Family: Nymphalidae
- Genus: Hyantis; Hewitson, 1862
- Species: H. hodeva

Binomial name
- Hyantis hodeva Hewitson, 1862

= Hyantis =

Hyantis hodeva

Monotypic brush-footed butterfly genus

Hyantis is a monotypic nymphalid butterfly genus. Its sole species is Hyantis hodeva, which is found in New Guinea. It is uncertain which tribe this butterfly should be placed within. The species is also distributed in Waigeo, Misool, Yapen and the D'Entrecasteaux Islands.

== Distribution ==
The species is distributed in the following islands: New Guinea, Waigeo, Misool, Yapen and D'Entrecasteaux Islands.

== Morphology ==
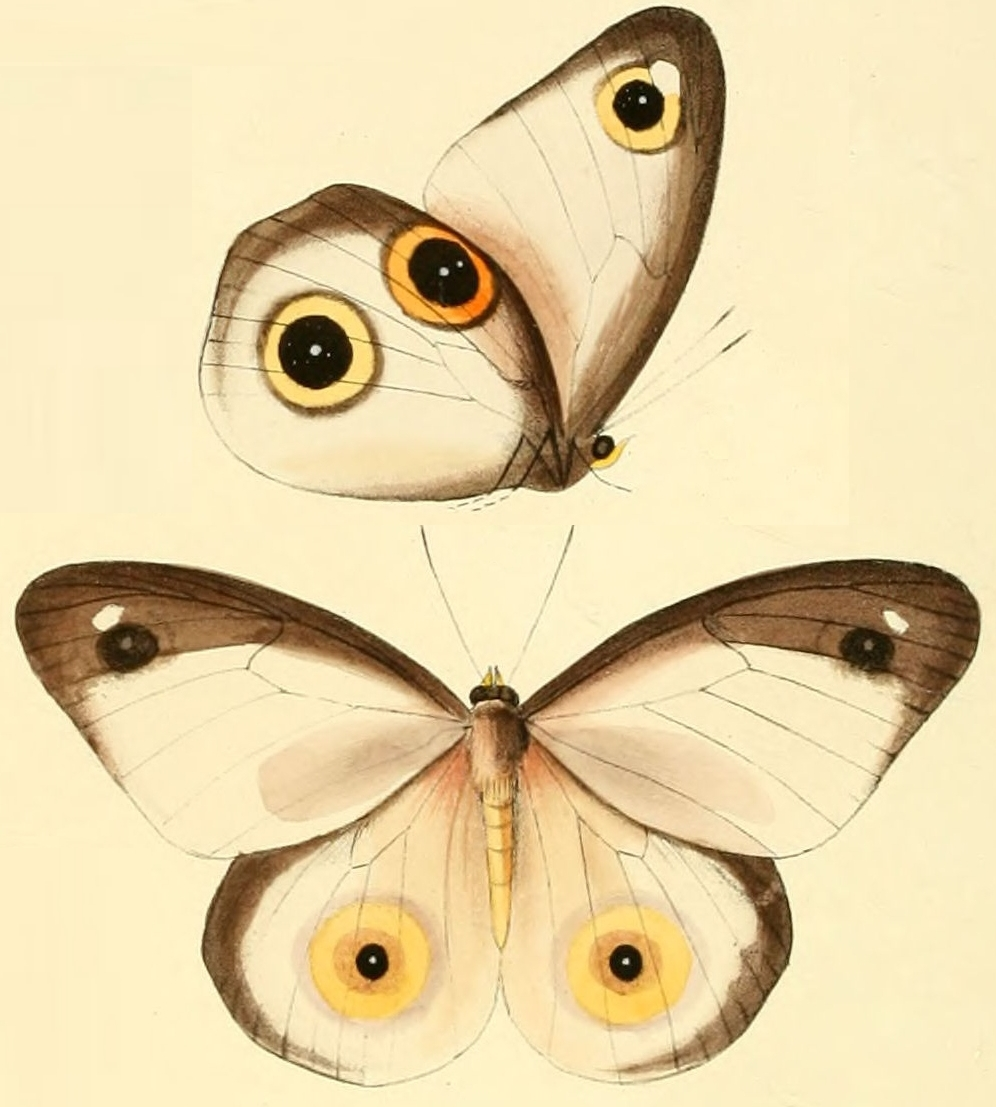
Illustrations of Hyantis hodeva in Hewitson 1867-1871 (Note: These illustrations are signed "W.C. Hewitson del et lith. 1862". "del et lith." is a signature indicating by whom the illustration was drawn and printed on the lithograph. Thus, this illustrations were drawn and printed on the lithograph by Hewitson in 1862 (although the whole book was published between 1868 and 1871).)

The species has three pairs of six well-developed ocellus on the ventral side of the wings: one pair on the forewings near the apex and two pairs on the hindwings. Each eyespot is large and bordered with yellow, and the black "pupil" has plural small white dots inside. This species is similar to Taenaris, but can be easily identified from that genus, which generally has only two or four ocellus with single white spot on its hindwings.

This species is also unique in having a closed discoidal cell on each hindwing. This morphological character is also shared by the genus Morphopsis and is generally found in the subfamily Satyrinae.

The early stage is unknown.

=== Mimicry ===
This species is very similar to Taenaris species, especially T. catops. Hyantis is also imitated by Mycalesis drusillodes (Satyrini), Taenaris by Elymnias agondas (Elymniini). It should be considered that these species may be involved in some kind of mimicry complex, but the details are not known.

== Systematics ==
The genus Hyantis (and putatively related Morphopsis) has traditionally been placed within tribe Amathusiini, even though there are differences in wing venation structures. Recent molecular phylogenetic analyses have been gradually resolved the confusion in the phylogenetic relationships in the subfamily Satyrinae, (Note: The tribes that formed subfamily Morphinae, such as tribe Amathusiini, are now included in the subfamily Satyrinae based on molecular phylogenetic analyses.) but the phylogenetic status of this genus remains confused, with several methods of analysis showing different results. For example: within the clade of Melanitini + Dirini (Peña & Wahlberg 2008), appears to be related with Elymnias (Wahlberg et al. 2009, Fig.1s), as sister to Amathusiini (Wahlberg et al. 2009, Fig.5s) and within Zetherini (Wahlberg et al. 2009, Fig.3s and Penz 2017). In any case, further studies are needed to clarify the phylogenetic position of this genus.

== Classification ==
This species contains 3 to 5 subspecies. The lower classification shown here is according to Wahlberg (2018), which recognizes 4 subspecies.

Hyantis Hewitson, 1862
- Hyantis hodeva Hewitson, 1862

- Hyantis hodeva hodeva Hewitson, 1862
- Hyantis hodeva helvola Stichel, 1905 (syn. Hyantis hodeva hageni Röber, 1903)
- Hyantis hodeva fulginosa Grose-Smith, 1898 (syn. Hyantis hodeva xanthophthalma Röber, 1903)
- Hyantis hodeva emarginata Fruhstorfer, 1916
