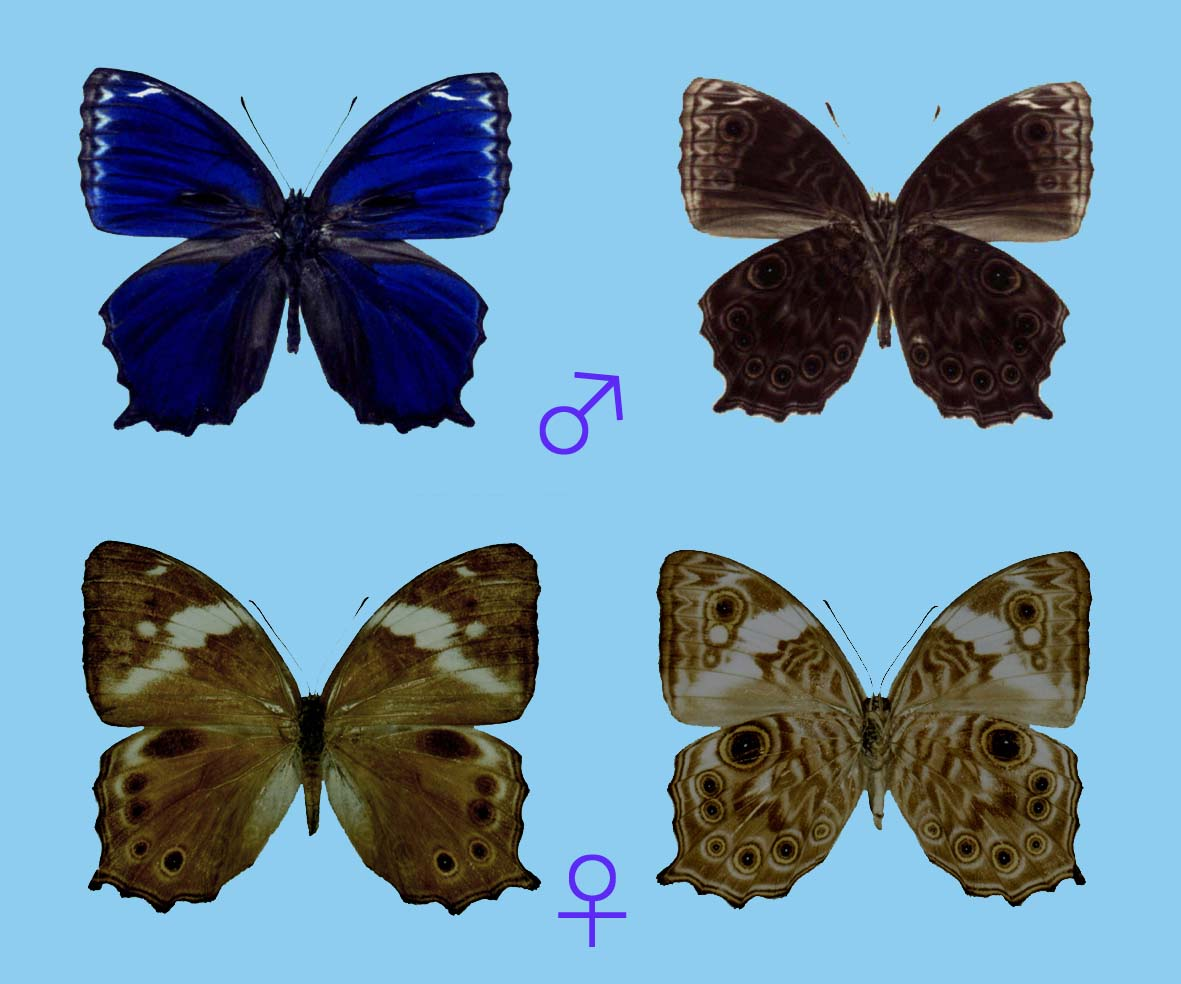
- Ptychandra ohtanii

Scientific classification
- Kingdom: Animalia
- Phylum: Arthropoda
- Class: Insecta
- Order: Lepidoptera
- Family: Nymphalidae
- Tribe: Satyrini
- Genus: Ptychandra; C. Felder & R. Felder, 1861

Type species
- Ptychandra lorquinii C. Felder & R. Felder

Species
- See text

= Ptychandra =

Genus of butterfly

Ptychandra is a butterfly genus in the subfamily Satyrinae within the family Nymphalidae. Ptychandra was first described by Cajetan Felder and Rudolf Felder in 1861. The genus comprises eight species, seven found in the Philippines with an additional species found on the island of Borneo. It is remarkable for the fact that it is one of a few genera to have undergone evolutionary radiation in the Philippine archipelago, with most other species being migrants from the Asian mainland.

== Taxonomy ==
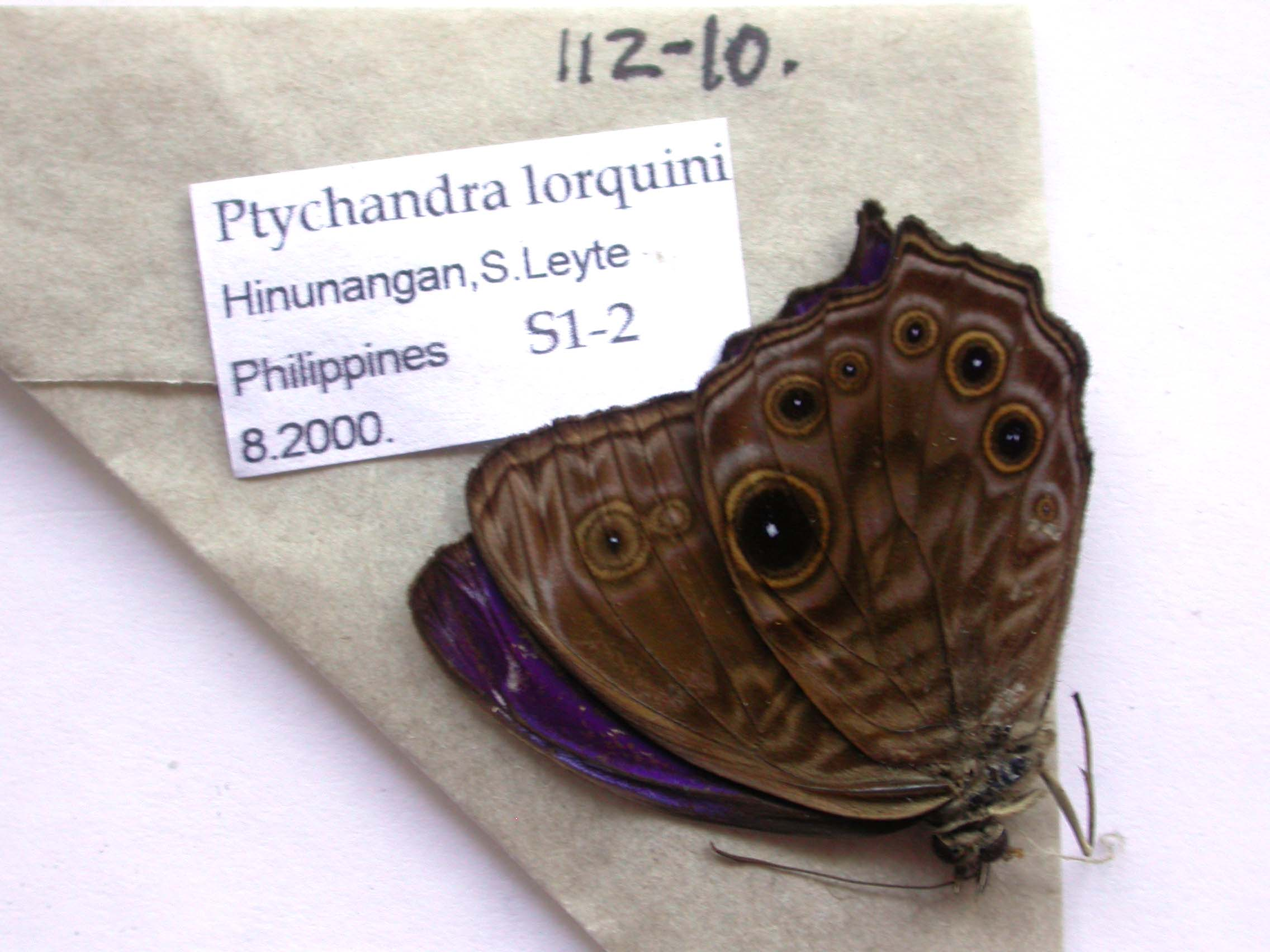
Ptychandra lorquinii, the type species

Ptychandra was described in 1861 by Cajetan von Felder and Rudolf Felder. The type species is Ptychandra lorquinii.

Previously described as "difficult to place satisfactorily in the higher classification of the Satyrinae", it has been previously grouped with the Elymniini and Melanitini. Fruhstorfer (1908) noted similarities with the characteristics of Mycalesis and Orsotriaena rather than Lethe. Reuter (1897) instead puts Ptychandra with Neorina in his Lethidi. Niklas Wahlberg as part of The Nymphalidae Systematics Group considers Ptychandra in the subtribe Lethina in the Satyrini.

Ptychandra talboti shows morphological differences compared to the remainder of the species found on the Philippines. It is considered as an early offshoot from the remainder of the genus. Four of the species are allopatric, with the remainder P. lorquinii overlapping with P. leucogyne on the island of Luzon and the central Philippines, as well as with P. schadenbergi on the southern part of the island. It is thought that sea level changes and the subsequent isolation of butterfly populations resulted in the butterfly distribution patterns in the region. Two theories exist for the evolutionary history of Ptychandra. One theory with P. mindorana, P. negrosensis, and P. schadenbergi have staying on their original isolation sites, P. leucogyne being isolated on the central portion of the Philippines and the southern peninsular region of Luzon, and P. lorquinii being isolated on Luzon. These areas of isolation match up with the appearance of the Philippine archipelago during times of lowered sea level. A secondary hypothesis, based on the morphology of the secondary sexual characteristics (coremata) of the butterflies, postulates three ancestral spread phases. The first spread of an ancestor over the Philippines and Borneo, resulting in three types emerging that would become the various species over time with differing morphologies.

=== Description ===
Males sport an iridescent blue-purple upperside wings with sometimes white or blueish subapical or antemarginal markings. This blue color is the result of the presence of scutes featured by the wing scales, which are layered and reflect blue light. The underside of the wings are brown in color, with marbled patterning of a darker brown, in addition to wavy transverse lines in the discal area. Some species sport silvery lines on their wing undersides. The underside sport a series of submarginal ocelli between the wing cells R5 to 1A + 2A. The ocelli patterning feature "imaginary outermost rings", scales which border the ocelli proper. The R5 cell often larger and inwardly displaced. The curbital branches of the forewing are displaced by modified scales which are covered by a Hair-pencil between veins CuA1 and M3, with the exception of Ptychandra schadenbergi, and a hair pencil pouched between veins CuA1 and CuA2 one third of the length of the wing and found in the interneural furrow, with the exception of P. talboti. The eyes of the butterfly are hairy, as are the palpi on the second segment. Antennae are half the length of the costa. The butterfly exhibits tibial spurs. The forewing cell of the male is one third of the length of the costa. Vein M3 is colinear with the lower discocellular vein. The median discocellular vein is almost straight between the origins for veins M2 and M3, slightly angled towards the origin of vein M2. This makes it meet with the lower discocellular vein, at an approximate right angle with it. The origins of both the subcostal and cubital veins are both slightly swollen at the base, and the anal vein is slightly less swollen. The hindwing cell is closed and is around half the length of the wing. The vein Sc + R1 is slightly inflated towards the humeral vein. The M3 vein extends past the margin of the wing to form a tail, with lobes at the edges of veins CuA1 and CuA2 for some species. The origins for veins CuA1 and M2 are separated from each other.

Female Ptychandra butterflies have a light brown wing upperside, with white or whitish patterns as well as a broad white subapical band on the forewing. The underside of the wings are brown and marked with darker brown wavy lines. There are submarginal ocelli akin to the males, but often larger in size. The wing venation resembles the male butterflies, with displaced cubital branches despite the lack of any brands of pouches that the males have. The females' bodies are similar to the males, but with antennae shorter than the length of the forewing.

== Life history ==
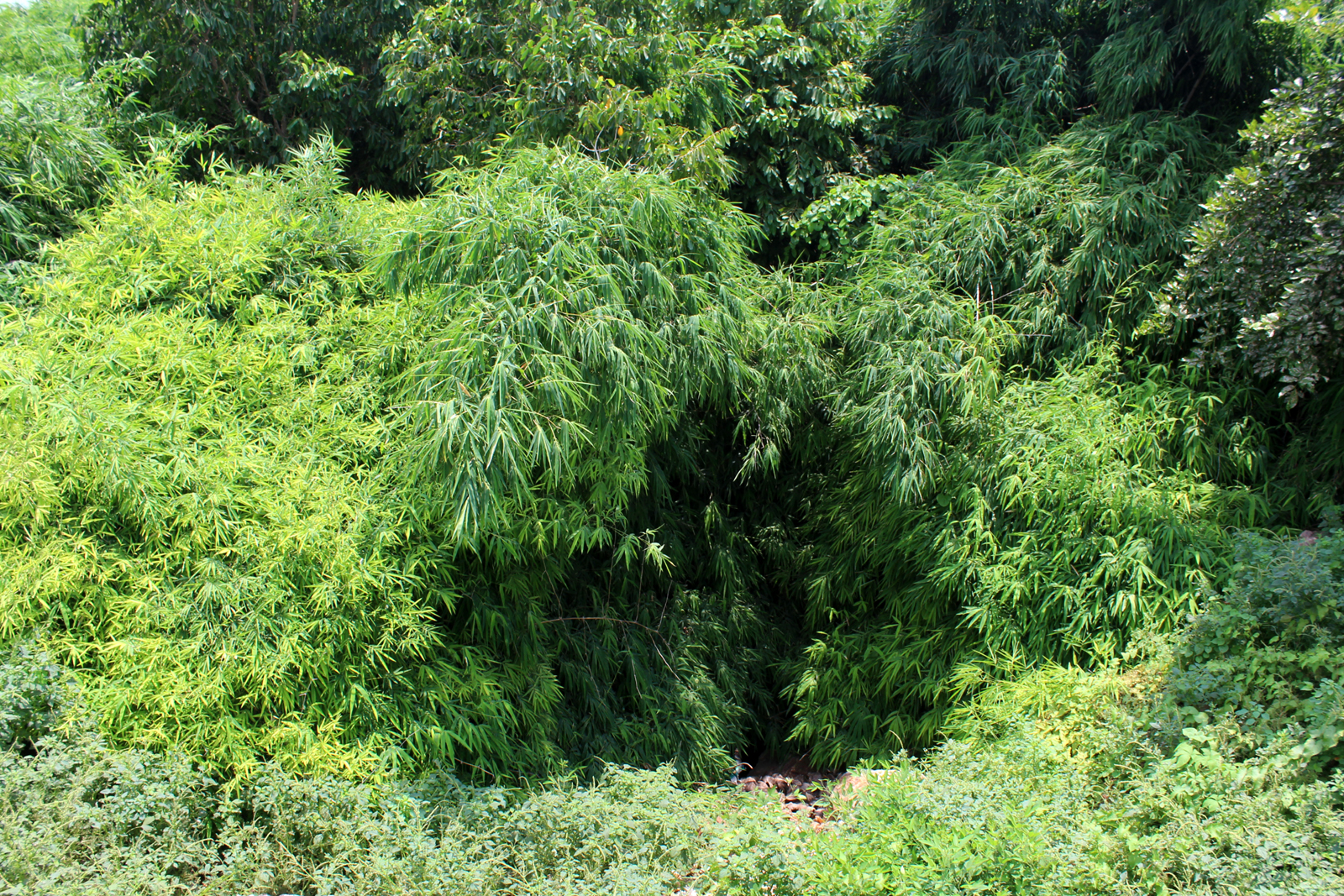
Ptychandra larvae feed on grasses such as members of the genus Bambusa

The larval stages of Ptychandra are poorly known. The larvae of Ptychandra lorquinii are known to feed on grasses in the genera Bambusa and Dinochloa.

The species are primarily woodland and forest butterflies found at an elevation between sea level and 700 metres (2,300 ft), with additional records of a Ptychandra lorquinii lorquinii at 2,000 metres (6,600 ft). They prefer to avoid direct sunlight, preferring dappled glades of forest instead. Males are seen in clusters settling on leaves obscured by shade and occasionally entering into flight. Males have been seen feeding on bird droppings and rotting fruit, with an observation of P. negrosensis feeding on cut grass stems with members of Amathusiid and Neptis butterflies. Different species are separated by their preferred habitat when their ranges overlap, with P. lorquinii and P. leucogyne being found in advanced secondary woodland and mature forest respectively. P. talboti is found in montane primary forest and is active during overcast weather. In flight, individuals of the genus resemble butterflies in the genus Lethe or Zemeros.

== Distribution ==
A majority of the species in Ptychandra are found in the Philippines, with the remainder being found in Borneo. Five of the seven then known species are found in the Philippine archipelago, an additional species being found in Palawan, and the final species being found in Northern Borneo. It is considered one of the few butterfly genera to have undergone evolutionary radiation in the Philippine archipelago, with most species found in the Philippines being migrants from Mainland Asia.

Ptychandra leucogyne is found on the islands of Camiguin de Luzon, Cebu, Leyte, Luzon, Masbate, Mindanao, Negros, Panay, Samar, and Sibuyan. P. lorquinii is found on Basilan, Biliran, Bohol, Camiguin de Luzon, Leyte, Luzon, Marinduque, Mindanao, Mindoro, Palawan, Samar, Sarangani, and Siargao. Both P. mizunumai and P. nakamotoi are found on Mount Apo in Mindanao. P. negrosensis is found on Bohol, Masbate, Negros, and West Panay. P. ohtanii is found on Leyte, Eastern Mindanao, and Sarangani. P. schadenbergi is found on Basilan and Mindanao. P. talboti is found on Sarawak's Mount Dulit, in addition to Mount Kinabalu in Sabah. There exist records of P. leucogyne on Halmahera or Batjan, but Semper (1889) states that it was probably erroneous.

== Species ==
There are six species of the genus Ptychandra found in the Philippines, with Badon and Nyuda, as well as Racheli and Biondi, listing Ptychandra mindorana Semper, 1892 as a distinct species. Funet recognizes eight total species in the genus, this interpretation is backed up by Wahlberg's species list:

- Ptychandra leucogyne C. & R. Felder, [1867]
- Ptychandra lorquinii C. & R. Felder, 1861
  - Ptychandra lorquinii bazilana Fruhstorfer, 1899
  - Ptychandra lorquinii boholensis Okano & Okano, 1989
  - Ptychandra lorquinii lorquinii C. & R. Felder, 1861
  - Ptychandra lorquinii mindorana Semper, 1892
  - Ptychandra lorquinii plateni Semper, 1892
- Ptychandra mizunumai Hayashi, 1978
- Ptychandra nakamotoi Hayashi, 1978
- Ptychandra negrosensis Banks, Holloway & Barlow, 1976
  - Ptychandra negrosensis negrosensis Banks, Holloway & Barlow, 1976
  - Ptychandra negrosensis angelalcalai Badon & Nuyda, 2020
- Ptychandra ohtanii Hayashi, 1978
  - Ptychandra ohtanii lizae Hayashi, 1978
  - Ptychandra ohtanii ohtanii Hayashi, 1978
- Ptychandra schadenbergi Semper, 1886
- Ptychandra talboti Hobby, 1940 — Bornean satyr
