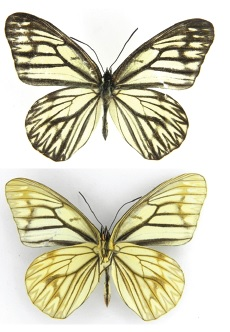
- Callarge sagitta dorsal and ventral view

Scientific classification
- Domain: Eukaryota
- Kingdom: Animalia
- Phylum: Arthropoda
- Class: Insecta
- Order: Lepidoptera
- Family: Nymphalidae
- Tribe: Elymniini
- Genus: Callarge; Leech, (1892)

= Callarge =

Genus of butterflies

Callarge is an east Asian genus of satyrine butterflies endemic to (China). Callarge appear to be mimics of species in the Danaini genus Parantica. The genus apparently approaches Zethera, a genus of the Indo-Australian butterflies consisting of but few species, some of which are strongly mimetic.

== Species ==
- Callarge occidentalis Leech, 1890
- Callarge sagitta (Leech, 1890)
