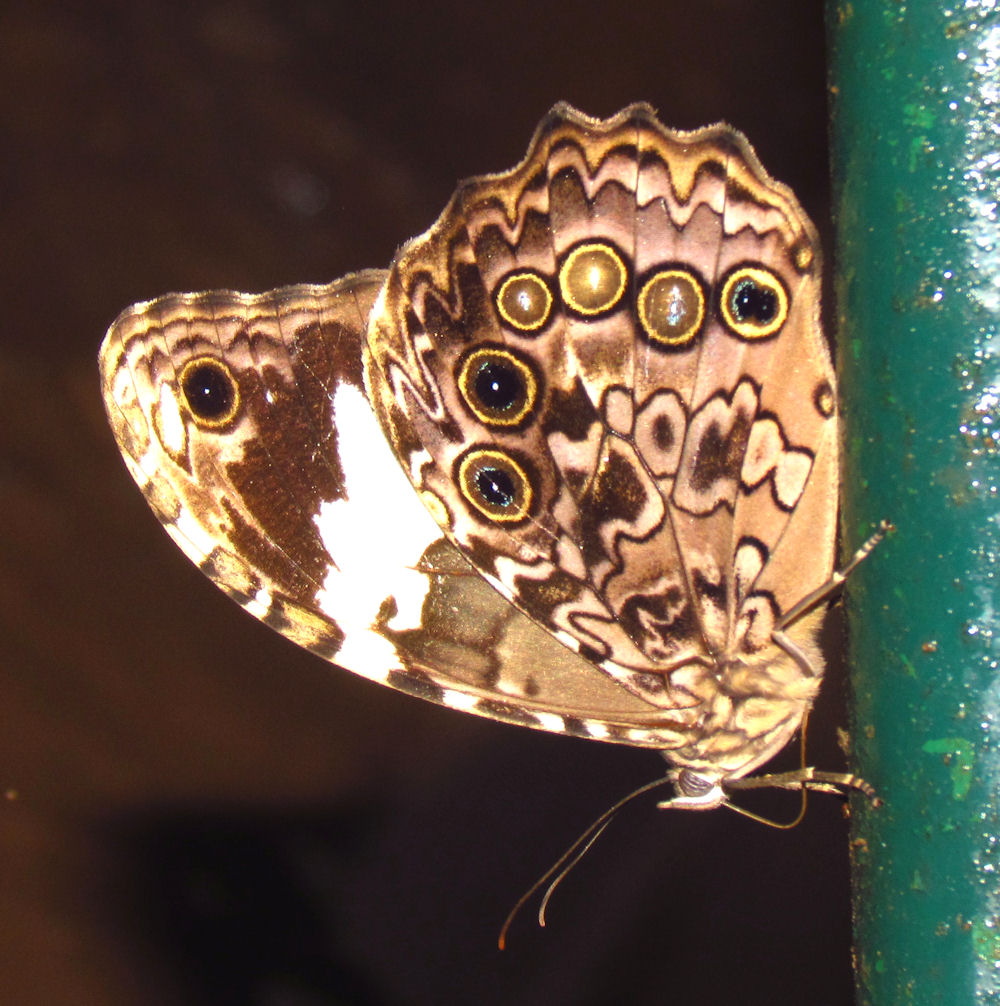
- nominate, Tambopata National Reserve, Peru
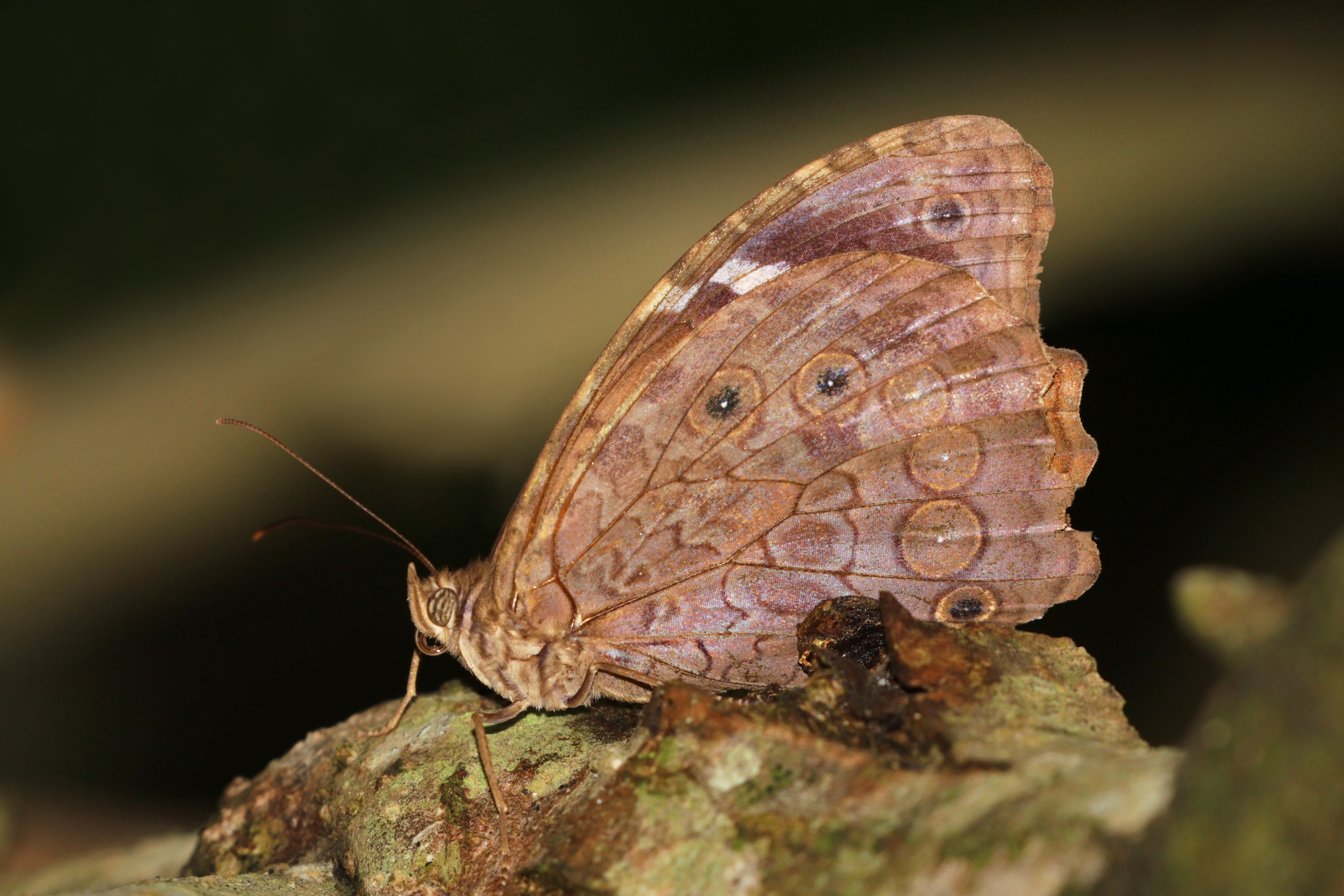
- M. h. maculata, Panama

Scientific classification
- Kingdom: Animalia
- Phylum: Arthropoda
- Class: Insecta
- Order: Lepidoptera
- Family: Nymphalidae
- Tribe: Melanitini
- Genus: Manataria; Kirby, [1904]
- Species: M. hercyna

Binomial name
- Manataria hercyna (Hübner, [1821])

Synonyms
- Tisiphone hercyna Hübner, [1821]; Morpho anosia Godart, [1824]; Tisiphone maculata Hopffer, 1874; Tisiphone hercyna var. fasciata Krüger, 1925; Tisiphane distincta Lathy, 1918; Tisiphone hercyna daguana Neustetter, 1929

= Manataria hercyna =

White-spotted satyr

Species of insect

Manataria hercyna, the white-spotted satyr, is the only member of the genus Manataria from the subfamily Satyrinae in the family Nymphalidae. It is found in the Neotropical zone.

== Subspecies ==
- M. h. hercyna – (Brazil, Peru)
- M. h. maculata (Hopffer, 1874) – (Costa Rica, Mexico)
- M. h. hyrnethia Fruhstorfer, 1912 – (Bolivia, Peru, Ecuador, Colombia)
- M. h. distincta (Lathy, 1918) – (French Guiana)
- M. h. daguana (Neustetter, 1929) – (Colombia)
