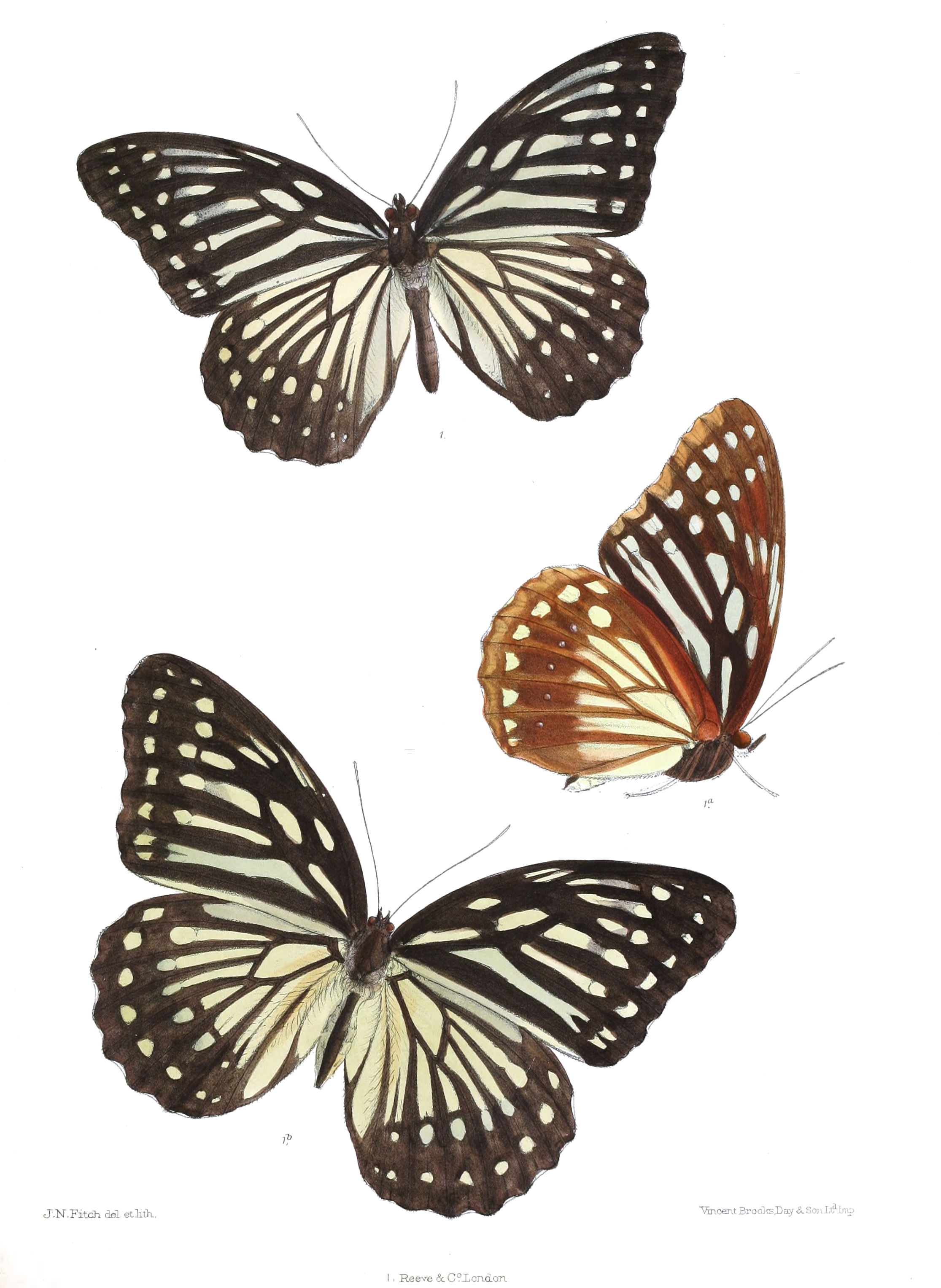

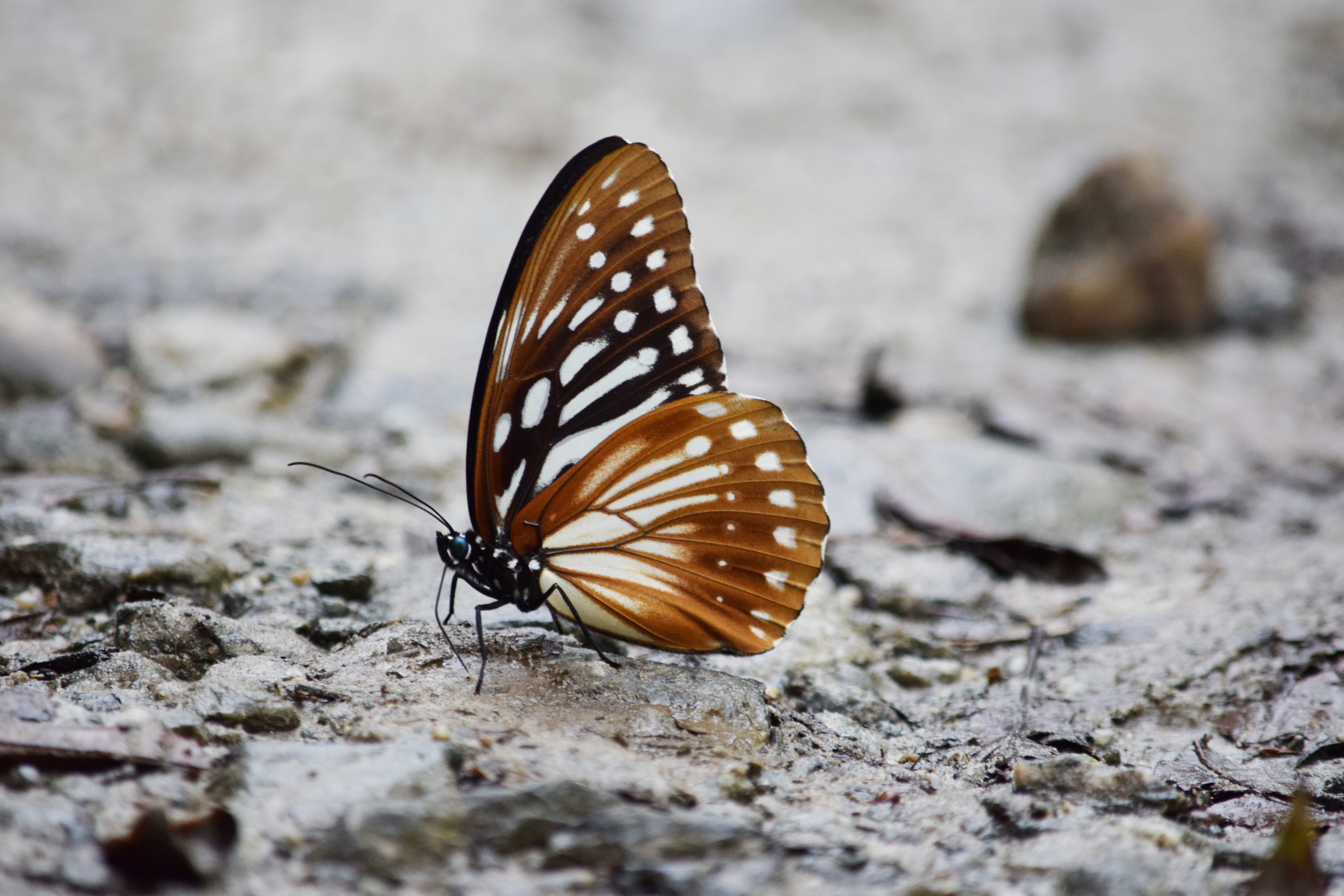

Scientific classification
- Domain: Eukaryota
- Kingdom: Animalia
- Phylum: Arthropoda
- Class: Insecta
- Order: Lepidoptera
- Family: Nymphalidae
- Genus: Penthema
- Species: P. lisarda

Binomial name
- Penthema lisarda (Doubleday, 1845)

Synonyms
- Diadema lisarda Doubleday, 1845

= Penthema lisarda =

Yellow kaiser

Species of butterfly

Penthema lisarda, the yellow kaiser, is a species of satyrine butterfly found along the Himalayas and in Indochina.

== Subspecies ==
- Penthema lisarda lisarda (Sikkim, Assam and possibly Bhutan)
- Penthema lisarda mihintala Fruhstorfer (Burma: Chin Hills)
- Penthema lisarda michallati Janet, 1894 (Indo China and possibly Hainan)
