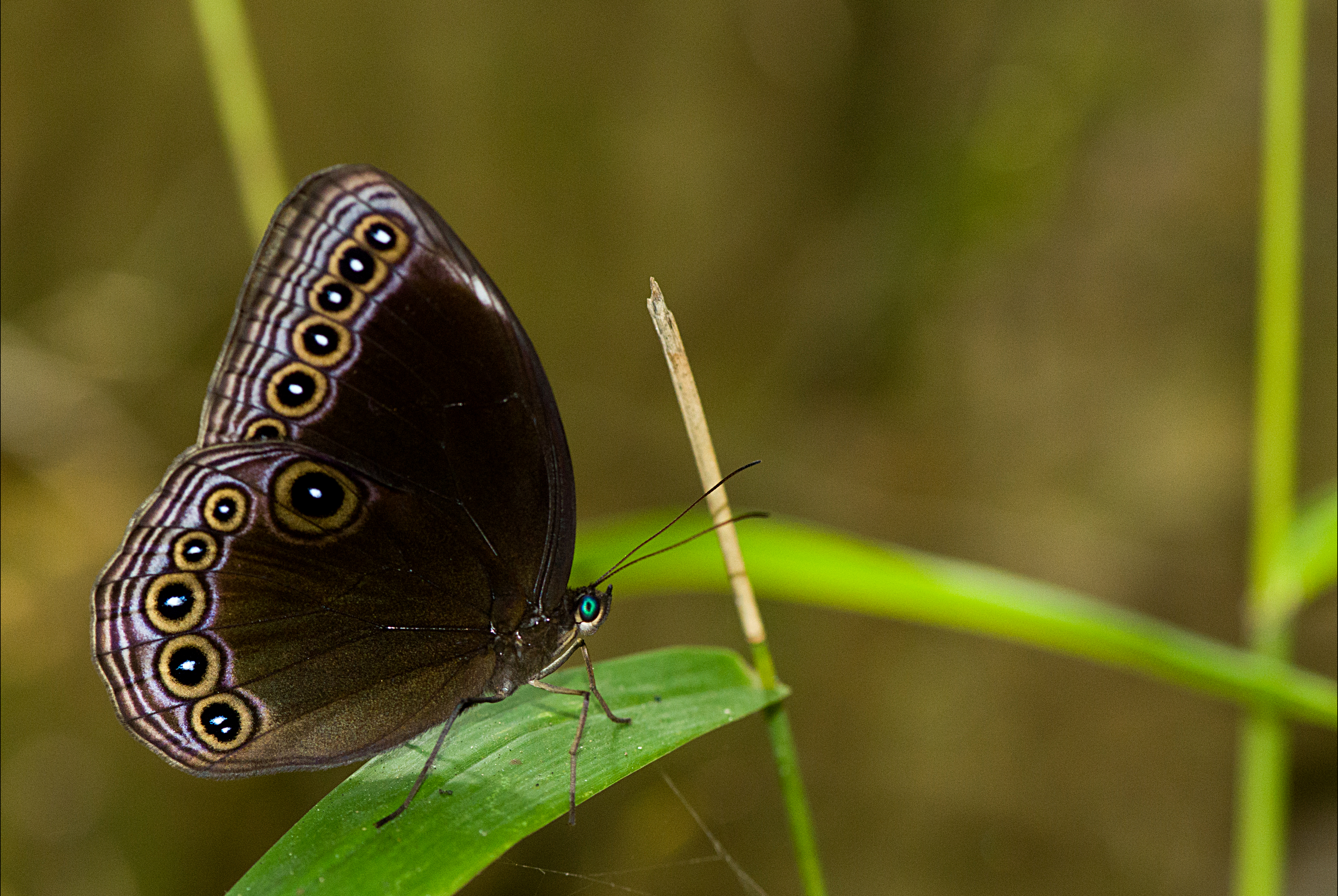
- Ethope himachala

Scientific classification
- Kingdom: Animalia
- Phylum: Arthropoda
- Class: Insecta
- Order: Lepidoptera
- Family: Nymphalidae
- Subfamily: Satyrinae
- Tribe: Elymniini
- Subtribe: Zetherina
- Genus: Ethope; Moore, 1866

Synonyms
- Theope Moore, 1857; Sita Herrich-Schäffer, 1864; Anadebis Butler, 1867; Euploeamina Holland, 1887

= Ethope =

Genus of butterfly

Ethope is a butterfly genus from the subfamily Satyrinae in the family Nymphalidae. The genus was erected by Frederic Moore in 1866.

== Species ==
According to GBIF, there are five accepted species in this genus, however, no other reference lists E. spec.

- Ethope diademoides (Moore, 1878)
- Ethope henrici (Holland, 1887)
- Ethope himachala (Moore, 1857)
- Ethope noirei Janet, 1896
- Ethope spec (Moore, 1857)

An overview of the species is given by Fruhstorfer in Seitz (1927)
