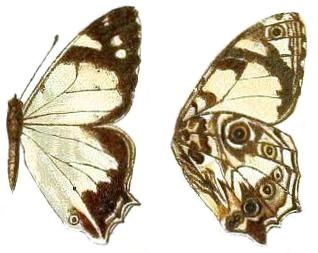
- Aphysoneura pigmentaria in Seitz's Fauna Africana

Scientific classification
- Kingdom: Animalia
- Phylum: Arthropoda
- Class: Insecta
- Order: Lepidoptera
- Family: Nymphalidae
- Tribe: Melanitini (?)
- Genus: Aphysoneura; Karsch, 1894

Diversity
- Two species

Synonyms
- Rhaphiceropsis Sharpe, 1894

= Aphysoneura =

Genus of butterflies

Aphysoneura is a genus of butterflies from the subfamily Satyrinae in the family Nymphalidae.

== Species ==
- Aphysoneura pigmentaria Karsch, 1894 – painted ringlet
- Aphysoneura scapulifascia Joicey & Talbot, 1922
