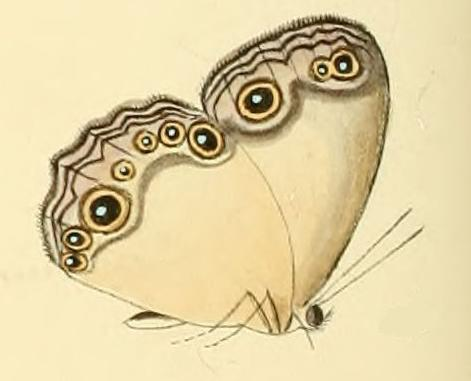
- Hallelesis asochis

Scientific classification
- Kingdom: Animalia
- Phylum: Arthropoda
- Class: Insecta
- Order: Lepidoptera
- Family: Nymphalidae
- Tribe: Elymniini
- Genus: Hallelesis; Condamin, 1961

Type species
- Mycalesis asochis Hewitson, 1866

Diversity
- Two species

= Hallelesis =

Genus of butterflies

Hallelesis is a butterfly genus from the subfamily Satyrinae in the family Nymphalidae.

== Species ==
- Hallelesis asochis (Hewitson, 1866)
- Hallelesis halyma (Fabricius, 1793)
