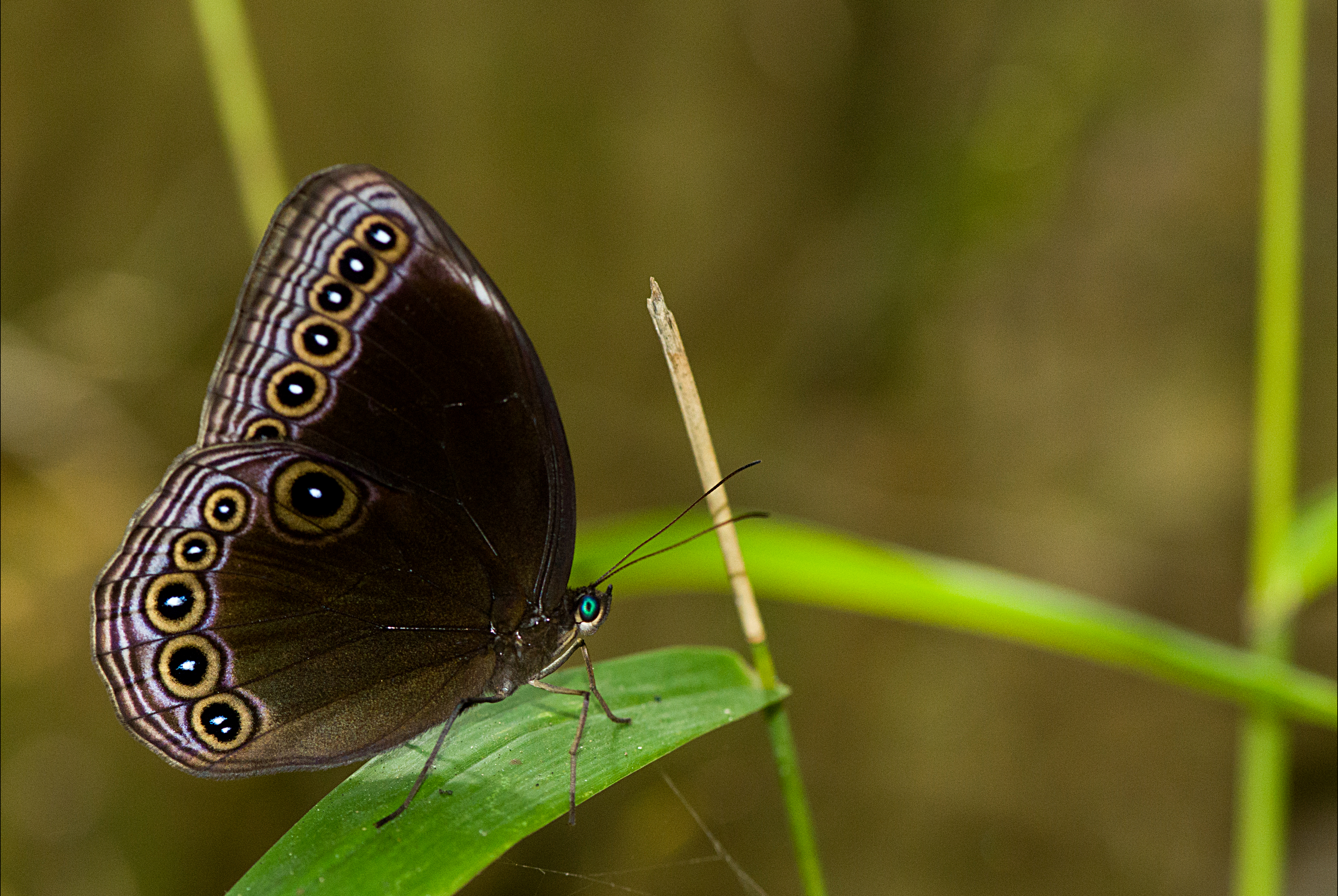

Scientific classification
- Domain: Eukaryota
- Kingdom: Animalia
- Phylum: Arthropoda
- Class: Insecta
- Order: Lepidoptera
- Family: Nymphalidae
- Genus: Ethope
- Species: E. himachala

Binomial name
- Ethope himachala (Moore, 1857)

Synonyms
- Mycalesis himachala Moore, 1857; Neorina sita C. & R. Felder, 1859

= Ethope himachala =

Dusky diadem

Species of butterfly

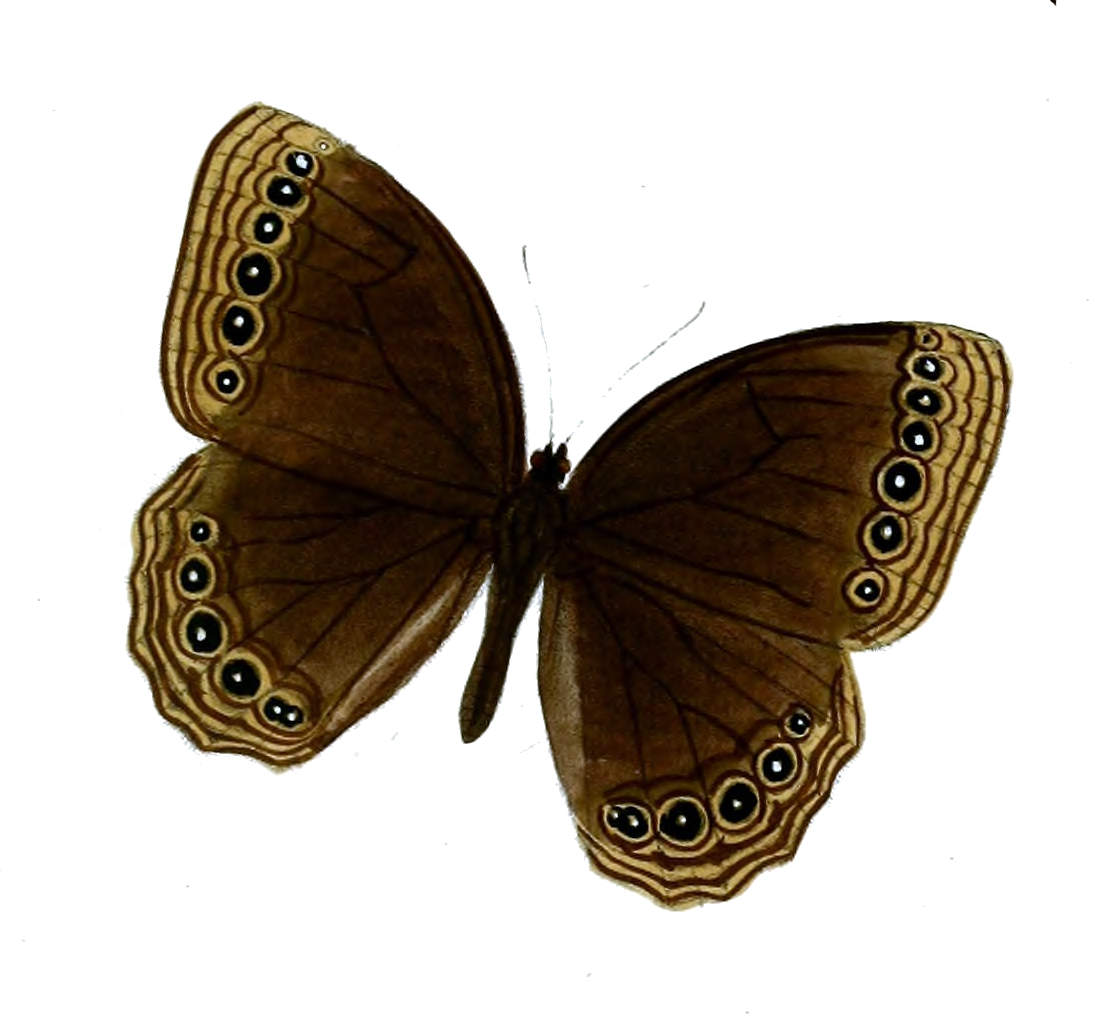

Ethope himachala, the dusky diadem, is a species of butterfly in the Satyrinae subfamily. It is found in parts of Asia, including north-western India, Assam, Burma and Thailand.
