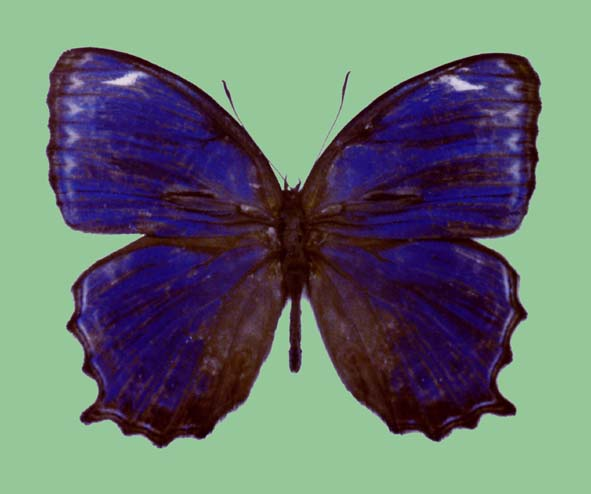
- Male upperside
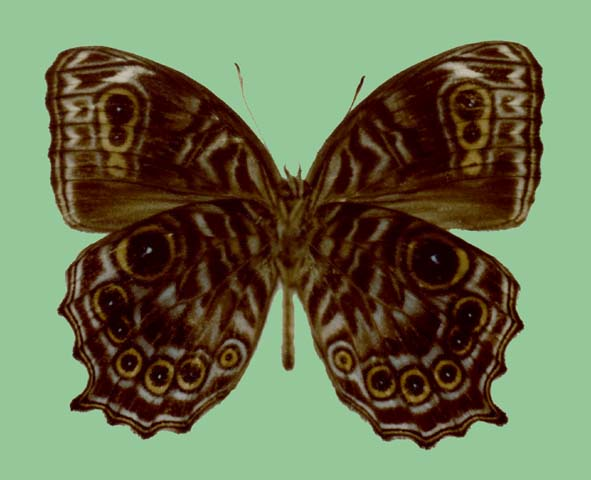
- Male underside

Scientific classification
- Kingdom: Animalia
- Phylum: Arthropoda
- Class: Insecta
- Order: Lepidoptera
- Family: Nymphalidae
- Genus: Ptychandra
- Species: P. ohtanii
- Subspecies: P. o. lizae

Trinomial name
- Ptychandra ohtanii lizae H. Hayashi, 1984

= Ptychandra ohtanii lizae =

Subspecies of insect

Ptychandra ohtanii lizae is a subspecies of Ptychandra ohtanii. Ptychandra ohtanii lizae is endemic to Leyte island in the Philippines. This subspecies is rare on Leyte island.

== Etymology ==
The subspecific name is dedicated to Mrs Liz Wilkinson from Winchester, England.

== Additional sources ==
- Hayashi, Hisakazu, 1978: Three new species of Ptychandra from Mt. Apo, Mindanao (Lepidoptera: Nymphalidae). Tyô to Ga. 29(4): 211–214.
- Hayashi, Hisakazu, 1984: New Synonyms, New Status, New Combinations, New Species and New Subspecies of Butterflies from the Philippines and Indonesia(Lepidoptera:Satyridae, Riodinidae, Lycaenidae). IWASE. 2: 1–20,31-34,pls.1,2(=pp.27,28).
- Aoki, T., Yamaguchi, S. & Uemura, Y., 2006: Additional notes on the satyrid butterflies after publication of "Butterflies of the South East Asian Islands Part3 Satyridae-Libytheidae" Part 1. Genera Bletogona-Ptychandra Butterflies,Tokyo,Shinjuku 43: 17,27.
- Treadaway, C. G. & Schrőder, Heinz , 2012. Revised checklist of the butterflies of the Philippine Islands (Lepidoptera: Rhopalocera) Nachrichten des Entomologischen Vereins Apollo Suppl.20: 1-64.
