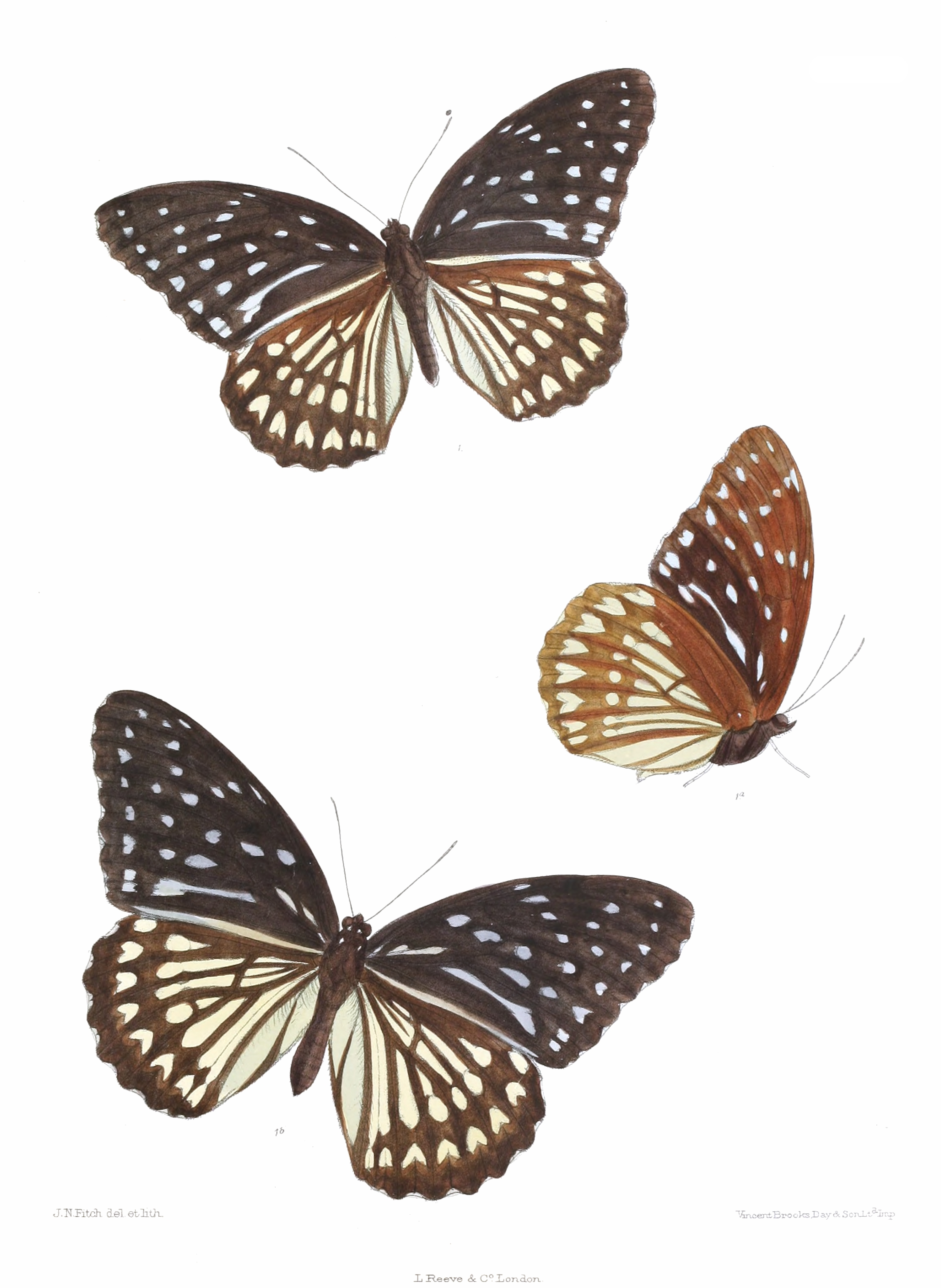

Scientific classification
- Kingdom: Animalia
- Phylum: Arthropoda
- Class: Insecta
- Order: Lepidoptera
- Family: Nymphalidae
- Genus: Penthema
- Species: P. darlisa

Binomial name
- Penthema darlisa Moore, 1879

Synonyms
- Penthema binghami mimetica Lathy, 1900; Penthema binghami godreyi Riley, 1932; Penthema binghami annamitica Fruhstorfer, 1902; Penthema binghami mergula Evans, 1924; Penthema darlisa miyashitai Okano, 1986

= Penthema darlisa =

Blue kaiser

Species of butterfly

Penthema darlisa, the blue kaiser, is a species of satyrine butterfly found along the Himalayas, extending into Southeast Asia.

== Subspecies ==
- Penthema darlisa darlisa (Assam to Burma, Yunnan, West Thailand)
- Penthema darlisa mimetica Lathy, 1900 (south-eastern Thailand)
- Penthema darlisa melema Riley & Godfrey, 1921 (northern Thailand, Laos, Vietnam)
- Penthema darlisa merguia Evans, 1924 (southern Burma, Peninsular Thailand)
- Penthema darlisa pallida Li, 1994 (Yunnan)
