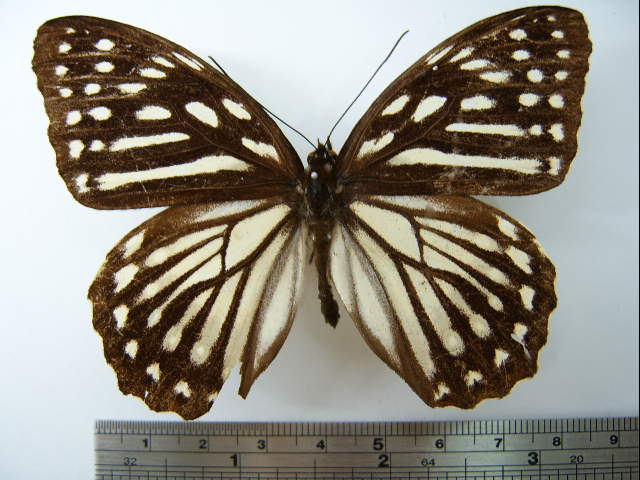

Scientific classification
- Kingdom: Animalia
- Phylum: Arthropoda
- Class: Insecta
- Order: Lepidoptera
- Family: Nymphalidae
- Genus: Penthema
- Species: P. formosanum

Binomial name
- Penthema formosanum Rothschild, 1898

Synonyms
- Penthema formosana

= Penthema formosanum =

Species of butterfly

Penthema formosanum is a butterfly of the family Nymphalidae. It is endemic to Taiwan.

The wingspan is 70–85 mm.

The larvae have been recorded on Sinocalamus oldhami, Bambusa multiplex and Phyllostachys makinoi.
