= Aphysoneura scapulifascia =

Scientific classification
- Domain: Eukaryota
- Kingdom: Animalia
- Phylum: Arthropoda
- Class: Insecta
- Order: Lepidoptera
- Family: Nymphalidae
- Genus: Aphysoneura
- Species: A. scapulifascia

Binomial name
- Aphysoneura scapulifascia Joicey & Talbot, 1922

Synonyms
- Aphysoneura pigmentaria occidentalis Joicey & Talbot, 1924; Aphysoneura pigmentaria scapulifascia Joicey & Talbot, 1923

Species of butterfly

Aphysoneura scapulifascia, the scapulate bamboo ringlet, western painted ringlet or western bamboo ringlet, is a butterfly in the family Nymphalidae. It is found in Nigeria, Cameroon, the Democratic Republic of the Congo, Uganda, Burundi, Kenya and possibly Rwanda and Tanzania. The habitat consists of the bamboo zone of montane forests.

The larvae feed on bamboo species and Arundinaria species.

== Subspecies ==
- Aphysoneura scapulifascia scapulifascia (Democratic Republic of the Congo: Kivu, Burundi, possibly Rwanda and Tanzania)
- Aphysoneura scapulifascia collinsi Kielland, 1989 (Kenya: Mount Elgon)
- Aphysoneura scapulifascia kigeziae Kielland, 1989 (Uganda: Kigezi district)
- Aphysoneura scapulifascia occidentalis Joicey & Talbot, 1924 (eastern Nigeria, Cameroon: highlands)
- Aphysoneura scapulifascia zairensis Kielland, 1989 (Democratic Republic of the Congo: Tshiaberimu)
