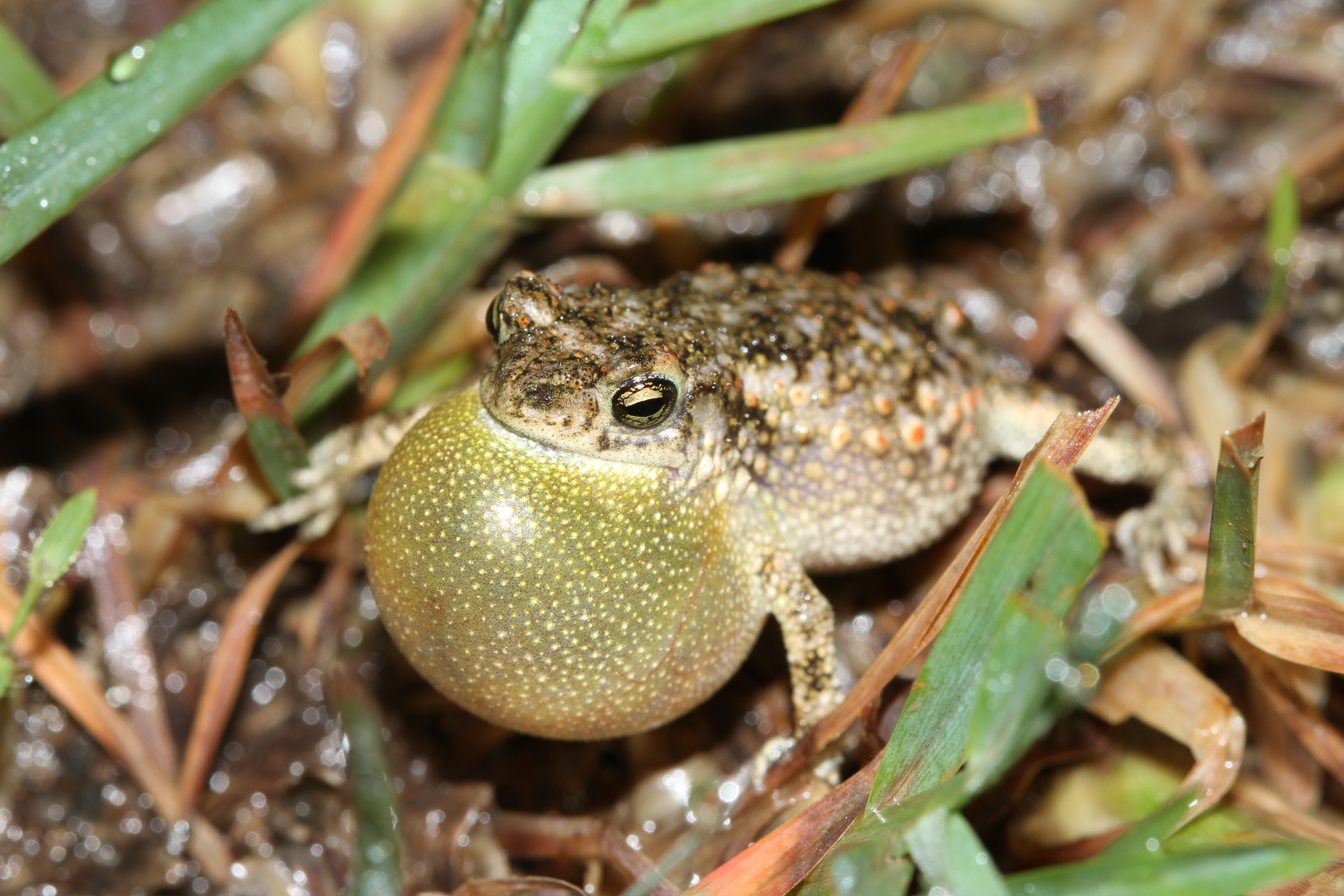

Conservation status
- Least Concern (IUCN 3.1)

Scientific classification
- Kingdom: Animalia
- Phylum: Chordata
- Class: Amphibia
- Order: Anura
- Family: Bufonidae
- Genus: Duttaphrynus
- Species: D. scaber

Binomial name
- Duttaphrynus scaber (Schneider, 1799)

Synonyms
- Bufo fergusonii Boulenger, 1882; Bufo scaber Schneider, 1799

= Duttaphrynus scaber =

Species of amphibian

Duttaphrynus scaber (common names: Schneider's (dwarf) toad, and for the now-synonymized Bufo fergusonii, Ferguson's toad and Boulenger's burrowing toad) is a species of toad in the family Bufonidae. It is found in peninsular India and Sri Lanka. Bufo fergusonii, now synonymized with Duttaphrynus scaber, was named after Harold S. Ferguson who collected the type specimen.

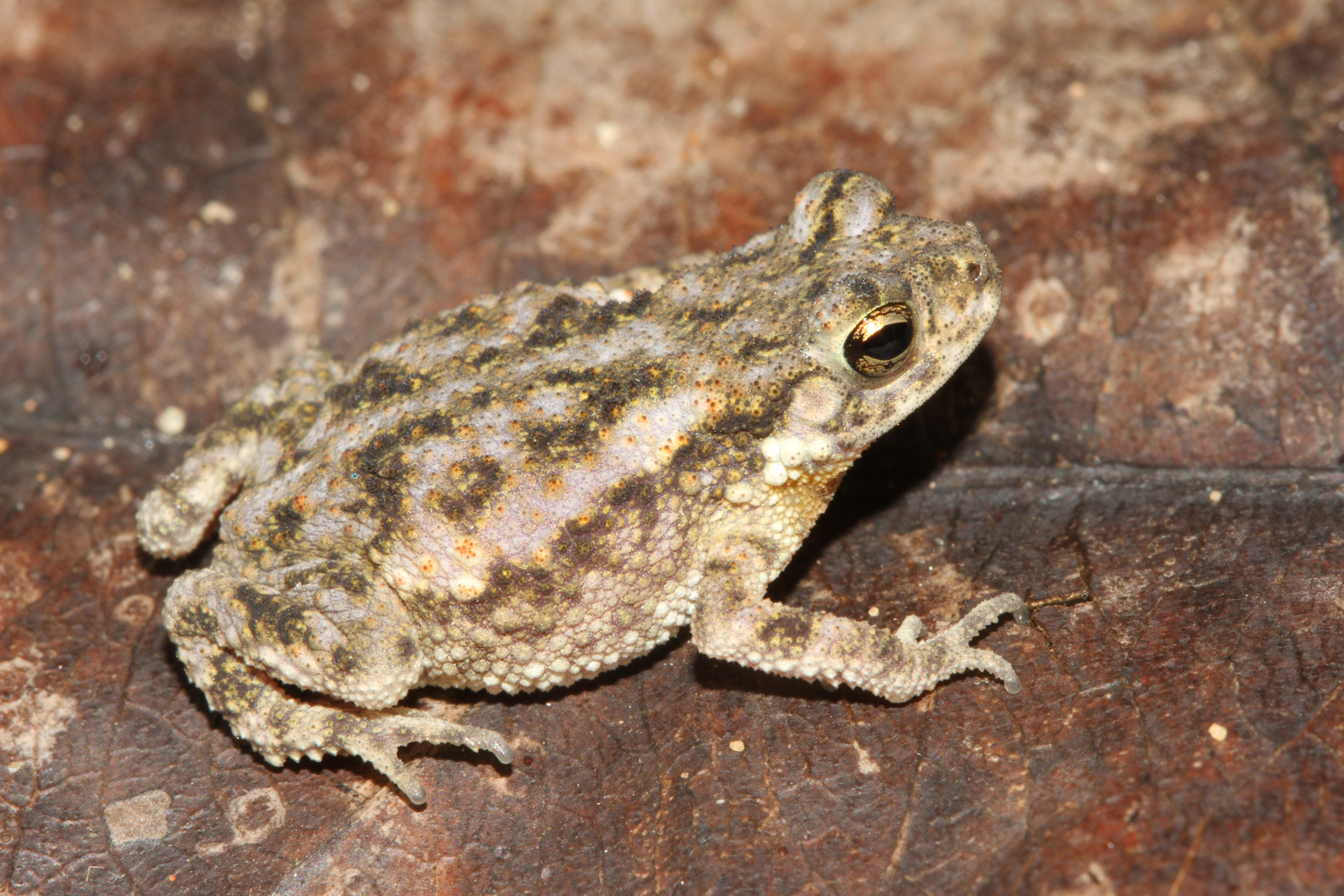

Duttaphrynus scaber is a widespread and common toad in India and Sri Lanka up to elevations of about 300 m (980 ft) asl. It is a terrestrial species that occurs in various habitats: wet evergreen tropical forest, tropical dry forest, dry scrubland, grassland, coastal marshes and rural farmland areas. Adult toads are generally found under ground cover, except during the breeding season when they are found in grasslands close to waterbodies. The tadpoles develop in stagnant waters.

In parts of its range, Duttaphrynus scaber is seriously threatened by habitat loss caused by deforestation, pollution, and urbanization.
