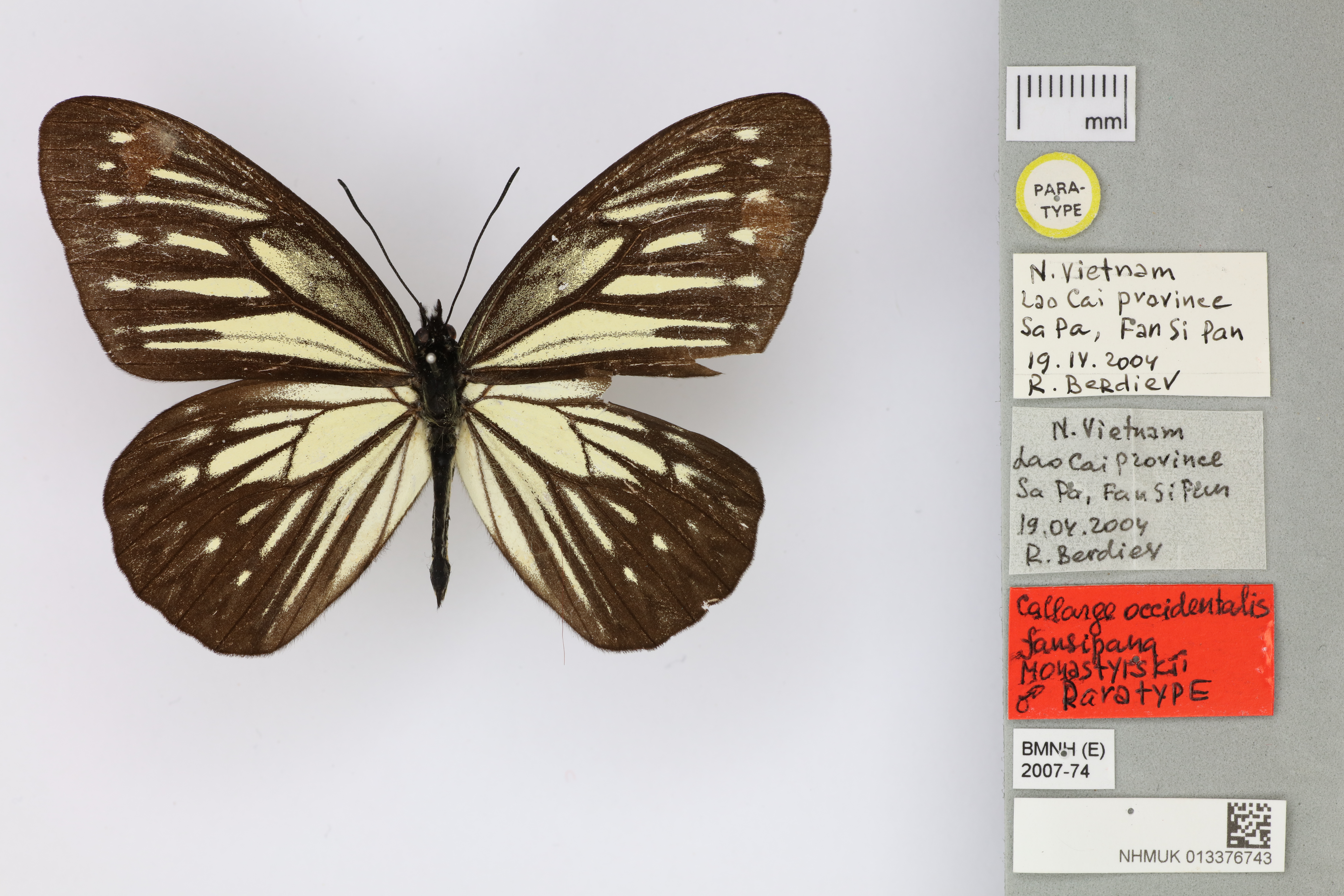

Scientific classification
- Kingdom: Animalia
- Phylum: Arthropoda
- Clade: Pancrustacea
- Class: Insecta
- Order: Lepidoptera
- Family: Nymphalidae
- Genus: Callarge
- Species: C. occidentalis

Binomial name
- Callarge occidentalis (Leech, 1890)

= Callarge occidentalis =

Species of insect

Callarge occidentalis is a butterfly found in the East Palearctic (West China and Japan) that belongs to the browns family.

== Description from Seitz ==
C. sagitta. Whitish, yellowish beneath, with dark veins, longitudinal shadows at the costal and hind margins, and feeble angle-shaped markings before the margin. On the Yang-tse-kiang. Two forms are known: sagitta Leech (41a), from Chang-Yang on the middle Yang-tse-kiang, is the light-coloured form, while occidentalis Leech, the western form from Wa-su-kow, has the ground-colour slightly shaded with ochreous and bears strong dark vein-streaks, the distal area of both wings being shaded with fuscous. According to Leech the nymotypical form appears to be very abundant at Chang -Yang.
