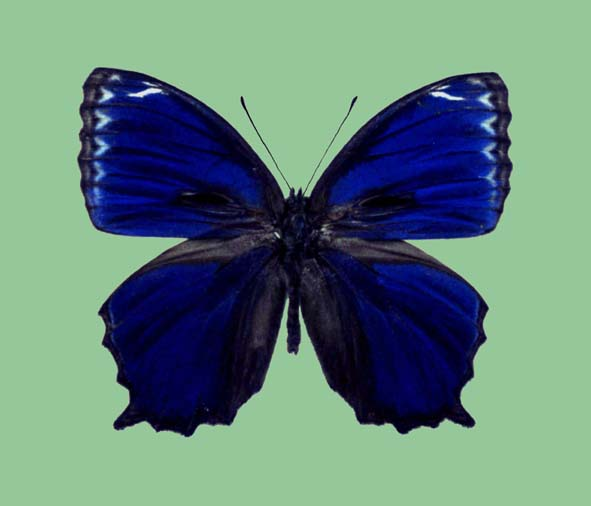
- Male upperside
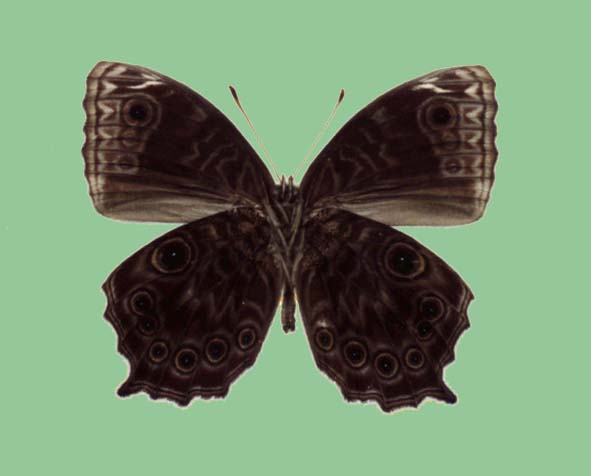
- Male underside

Scientific classification
- Domain: Eukaryota
- Kingdom: Animalia
- Phylum: Arthropoda
- Class: Insecta
- Order: Lepidoptera
- Family: Nymphalidae
- Genus: Ptychandra
- Species: P. ohtanii

Binomial name
- Ptychandra ohtanii H. Hayashi, 1978

= Ptychandra ohtanii =

Species of insect

Ptychandra ohtanii is a butterfly of the family Nymphalidae. It is endemic to the Philippines. Its forewing length is 26–29 mm. The species resembles P. lorquinii. Black hair-pencil is arising in space 3 of forewing upperside in P. ohtanii whereas arising on cubitus in P. lorquinii. The nominotypical subspecies is distributed only on Mount Apo on Mindanao island. Another subspecies is found on Leyte island. The species is rare on both islands.

Etymology. The specific name is dedicated to Mr.Takuya OHTANI, Japanese butterfly collector.

== Subspecies ==
- Ptychandra ohtanii ohtanii H. Hayashi, [1978]
- Ptychandra ohtanii lizae H. Hayashi, [1984] (Leyte)
