= Harold S. Ferguson =

Scottish zoologist

Harold Stuart Ferguson M.B.E. (10 February 1851 – 5 January 1921) was a Scottish zoologist who worked in the south Indian princely state of Travancore, contributing to the local museum.

== Life and work ==
Ferguson was born in Park Street, near Grosvenor Square, London, the fourth child of Robert Ferguson (1799–1865) and Mary Mcleod of Skye. His father was born in India, a close friend of Sir John Macpherson, Governor-General of India, and Sir Walter Scott. Robert was an eminent physician who also took an interest in insects, literature and other matters becoming Physician Extraordinary to Queen Victoria. After being educated at Eton and Wimbledon he joined the military academy at Woolwich. He joined the Royal Artillery and then resigned to become a tutor to three princes of Travancore. After the princes grew, he joined as second in command of the Nair Brigade under the Maharaja of Travancore. He retired from the position in 1904 and took charge of establishing the museum in Trivandrum and the public gardens where he helped manage a menagerie. He was elected a fellow of the Linnean Society. Harold spent most of his life in India in Travancore. He retired to London and took a keen interest in the zoological gardens where he became a member of the council while also working at the London Rifle Brigade headquarters.

Ferguson was married to Isabel Julia Maxwell, niece of Field Marshal Lord Roberts and daughter of Colonel Hamilton Maxwell of the Bengal Staff Corps. They had three sons who served in the army.

== Sports ==
Ferguson played cricket for the MCC prior to leaving for India. He was an athlete and held an amateur record for a long jump of 21 feet 2.5 inches until it was broken by C. B. Fry. He also played soccer and made two appearances for the Scottish XI against England in the football pseudo-internationals in 1871 and 1872.

== Career as zoologist ==
Ferguson was connected to the State Museum at Trivandrum from 1880 onwards, and from 1894 until his retirement from India in 1904 was director of the museum. Ferguson was interested in all aspects of natural history of the region and he contributed to the herpetology of the state.

He became a member of the British Ornithologists' Union in 1886 and was elected a fellow of the Zoological Society in 1891. He is commemorated in the scientific name of a species of Indian snake, Rhinophis fergusonianus. Ferguson's toad Bufo scaber is named after him. He discovered a species of butterfly endemic to the southern Western Ghats, the Travancore evening brown butterfly (Parantirrhoea marshalli ) as well as Mycalesis oculus.

He contributed numerous specimens to the collections of the British Museum.

== Other sources ==
- Travancore museum
- Public gardens of Travancore
