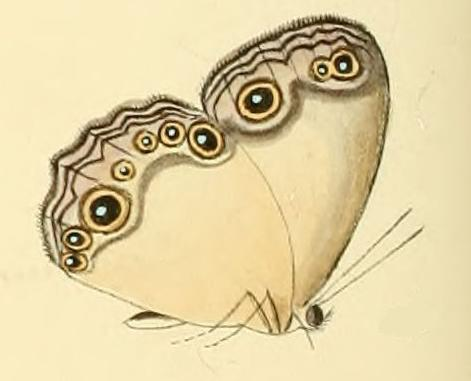

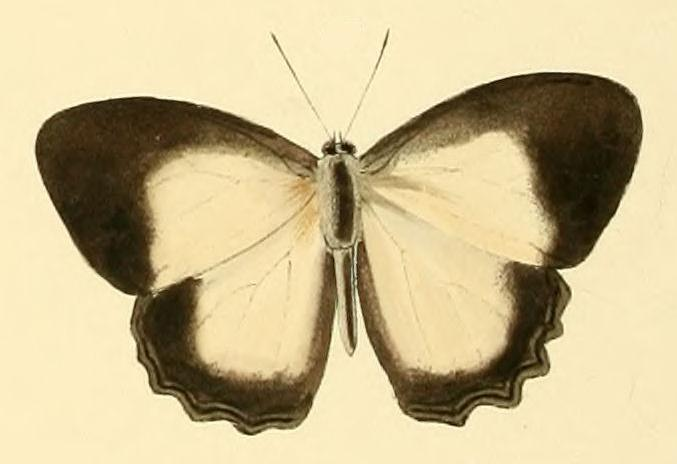

Scientific classification
- Domain: Eukaryota
- Kingdom: Animalia
- Phylum: Arthropoda
- Class: Insecta
- Order: Lepidoptera
- Family: Nymphalidae
- Genus: Hallelesis
- Species: H. asochis

Binomial name
- Hallelesis asochis (Hewitson, 1866)

Synonyms
- Mycalesis asochis Hewitson, 1866; Mycalesis asochis congoensis Joicey & Talbot, 1921; Mycalesis asochis ab. triocelligera Strand, 1914; Mycalesis asochis f. kamitugensis Dufrane, 1945

= Hallelesis asochis =

Species of butterfly

Hallelesis asochis, the eastern hallelesis, is a butterfly in the family Nymphalidae. It is found in Nigeria, Cameroon, the Republic of the Congo, the Central African Republic, Angola and the Democratic Republic of the Congo. The habitat consists of swampy areas, usually in forests.

== Subspecies ==
- Hallelesis asochis asochis (Nigeria, Cameroon)
- Hallelesis asochis congoensis (Joicey & Talbot, 1921) (southern Cameroon, Congo, Central African Republic, Angola, eastern Democratic Republic of the Congo)
