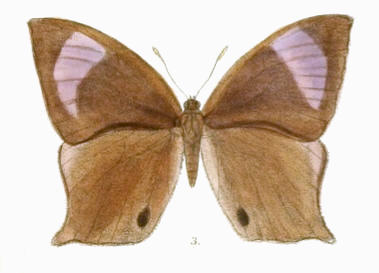

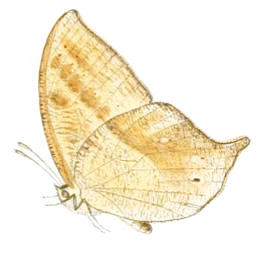

Scientific classification
- Domain: Eukaryota
- Kingdom: Animalia
- Phylum: Arthropoda
- Class: Insecta
- Order: Lepidoptera
- Family: Nymphalidae
- Tribe: Melanitini
- Genus: Parantirrhoea; Wood-Mason, 1881
- Species: P. marshalli

Binomial name
- Parantirrhoea marshalli Wood-Mason, 1881

= Parantirrhoea =

Tranvancore evening brown

Genus of butterflies

Parantirrhoea is a monotypic butterfly genus in the family Nymphalidae. Its only species, Parantirrhoea marshalli, the Tranvancore evening brown, is endemic to the Western Ghats of India. James Wood-Mason described this species from the specimens in the collection of G F L Marshall which were collected by Harold S. Ferguson who was director of the State Museum at Trivandrum. Little was known about the species in the wild until a population was discovered in the Periyar Tiger Reserve in 1993. Sightings of both sexes of this butterfly are reported in the southern region of the Western Ghats in 2002 (Kunhikrishnan (2002)). In 2006, larvae were collected from an Etah jungle like habitat in Kallar-Ponmudi valley, a northerly extension of the Ashambu hills of southern Western Ghats. Caterpillars collected were reared in laboratory conditions. It is also known from Periyambadi in Kodagu.

== Description ==
Males and females: Upperside, both wings dark fuscous suffused with rich deep violet. Forewing with an outwardly and forwardly arched subcrescentic pale violet or mauve band, commencing beyond the middle of the wing at the costal vein, terminating at the inner angle, and crossed obliquely by a series of three small white spots disposed in a straight line parallel to the outer margin, and placed upon folds of as many consecutive interspaces, the last being between the second and third median vein. Hindwing relatively longer tailed than in Melanitis ismene Cramer, with the membranous parts of the divergent tail almost wholly formed by the produced wing-membrane of the interspace between the second and third median vein, a very narrow anterior membranous edging being contributed by the interspace next in front; and with rather more than the basal two-thirds of its length in front of the discoidal vein and subcostal vein ochreous.

Underside: both wings ochreous, obscurely striated with a deeper shade of the same colour, and marked with a submarginal series of inconspicuous brown specks, the probable rudiments of ocelli.
