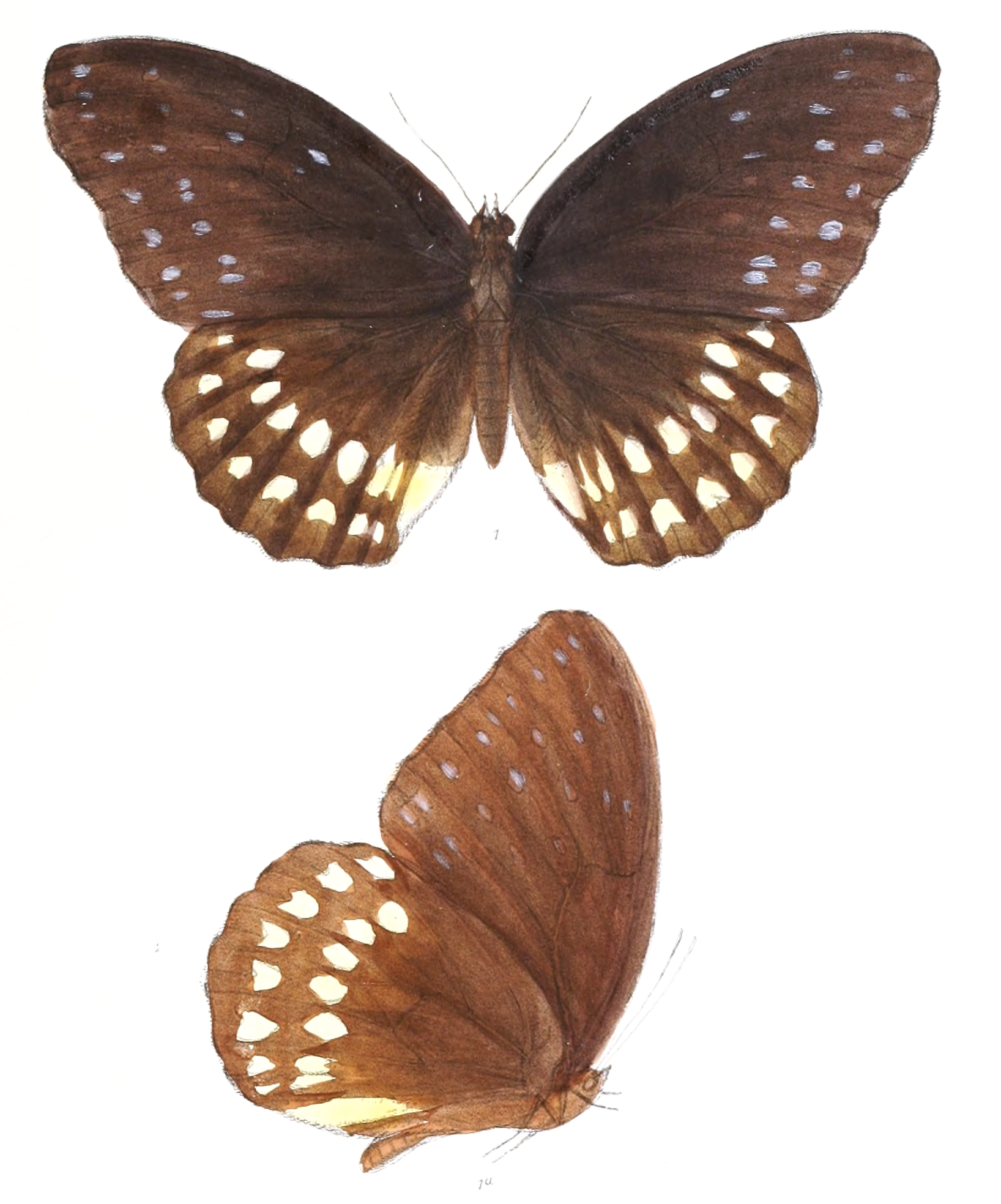
- Penthema binghami

Scientific classification
- Domain: Eukaryota
- Kingdom: Animalia
- Phylum: Arthropoda
- Class: Insecta
- Order: Lepidoptera
- Family: Nymphalidae
- Subfamily: Satyrinae
- Genus: Penthema; Doubleday, [1848]

Synonyms
- Paraplesia C. & R. Felder, 1862 (preocc.); Isodema C. & R. Felder, 1863

= Penthema =

Genus of butterflies

Penthema is an east Asian genus of satyrine butterflies.

== Species ==
- Penthema adelma (C. & R. Felder, 1862) China.
- Penthema binghami Wood-Mason, 1881 – blue kaiser Burma, Thailand
- Penthema darlisa Moore, 1878
- Penthema formosanum Rothschild, 1898
- Penthema lisarda (Doubleday, 1845) – yellow kaiser
