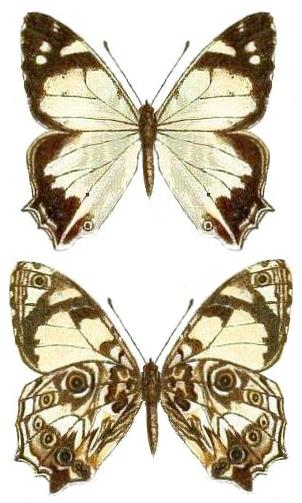
- Upper and underside in Adalbert Seitz's Fauna Africana

Scientific classification
- Domain: Eukaryota
- Kingdom: Animalia
- Phylum: Arthropoda
- Class: Insecta
- Order: Lepidoptera
- Family: Nymphalidae
- Genus: Aphysoneura
- Species: A. pigmentaria

Binomial name
- Aphysoneura pigmentaria Karsch, 1894

Synonyms
- Aphysoneura pigmentaria var. latilimba Le Cerf, 1919; Aphysoneura obnubila Riley, 1923; Rhaphiceropsis pringlei Sharpe, 1894; Aphysoneura pigmentaria var. kenyae Le Cerf, 1919

= Aphysoneura pigmentaria =

Painted ringlet

Species of butterfly

Aphysoneura pigmentaria, the painted ringlet, bamboo painted ringlet or bamboo ringlet, is a butterfly in the family Nymphalidae. It is found in the DRC, Uganda, Kenya, Tanzania, Malawi, Zambia and Zimbabwe. The habitat consists of the bamboo zone of montane forests.

Adults are on wing year round.

The larvae feed on Sinarundinaria alpina, Oxytenanthera abyssinica and Festuca africana.

== Subspecies ==
- Aphysoneura pigmentaria pigmentaria (north-eastern Tanzania)
- Aphysoneura pigmentaria dewittei Bouyer, 2001 (Democratic Republic of the Congo)
- Aphysoneura pigmentaria kanga Kielland, 1989 (Tanzania)
- Aphysoneura pigmentaria kiellandi Congdon & Collins, 1998 (southern Kenya, northern Tanzania)
- Aphysoneura pigmentaria latilimba Le Cerf, 1919 (Zambia, Malawi: south to Mount Mlanje)
- Aphysoneura pigmentaria mbulu Kielland, 1989 (Tanzania: Mbulu highlands)
- Aphysoneura pigmentaria obnubila Riley, 1923 (southern Tanzania, northern Malawi)
- Aphysoneura pigmentaria pringlei (Sharpe, 1894) (eastern Uganda, Kenya: Kikuyu to Victoria Nyanza)
- Aphysoneura pigmentaria semilatilimba Kielland, 1989 (eastern Democratic Republic of the Congo, Tanzania: montane areas of Kigoma, Mpanda and Ufipa)
- Aphysoneura pigmentaria seminigra Kielland, 1985 (eastern Tanzania)
- Aphysoneura pigmentaria songeana Kielland, 1989 (Tanzania: Kitesa Forest in the Matengo Hills)
- Aphysoneura pigmentaria uzungwa Kielland, 1989 (east-central Tanzania)
- Aphysoneura pigmentaria vumba Kielland, 1989 (Zimbabwe)
