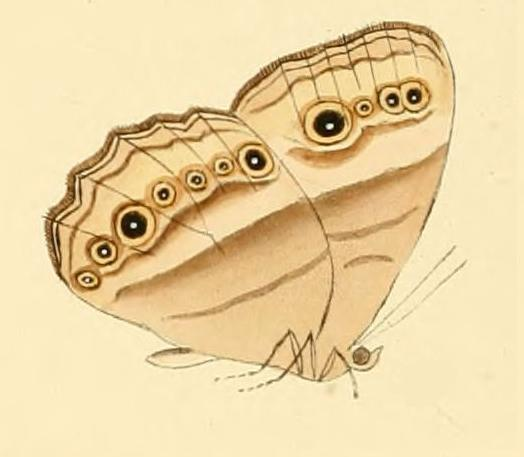

Scientific classification
- Kingdom: Animalia
- Phylum: Arthropoda
- Clade: Pancrustacea
- Class: Insecta
- Order: Lepidoptera
- Family: Nymphalidae
- Genus: Hallelesis
- Species: H. halyma

Binomial name
- Hallelesis halyma (Fabricius, 1793)

Synonyms
- Papilio halyma Fabricius, 1793; Mycalesis halyma; Mycalesis macrones Hewitson, 1873

= Hallelesis halyma =

Species of butterfly

Hallelesis halyma, the western hallelesis, is a butterfly in the family Nymphalidae. It is found in Guinea, Sierra Leone, Liberia, Ivory Coast and western Ghana. The habitat consists of swampy areas inside forests of good quality.
