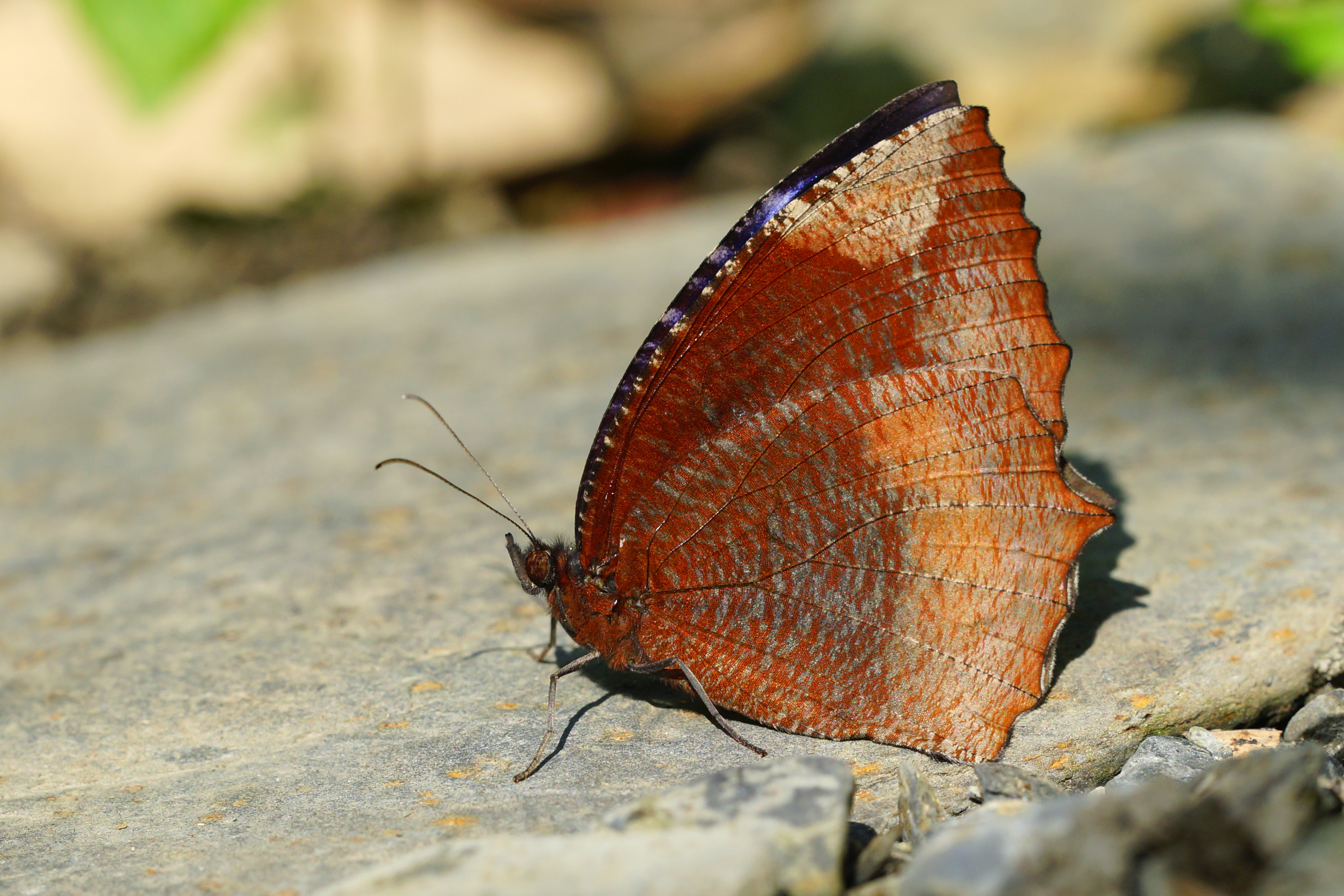
- Elymnias hypermnestra hainana, Taiwan

Scientific classification
- Kingdom: Animalia
- Phylum: Arthropoda
- Clade: Pancrustacea
- Class: Insecta
- Order: Lepidoptera
- Family: Nymphalidae
- Subfamily: Satyrinae
- Tribe: Elymniini; Herrich-Schäffer, 1864

Genus
- Elymnias

Diversity
- only one genus, 52 species

= Elymniini =

Tribe of butterflies

The Elymniini is one of the tribes of the subfamily Satyrinae. If the subfamily Satyrinae elevate to family status, this tribe shall be treated as subfamily Elymniinae. Elymniini was formerly a large group, but recently, it is considered to be include only one genus, Elymnias, according to molecular phylogenetic analyses.

== Systematics and taxonomy ==
The systematics and taxonomy of Satyrinae began to be heavily revised around the 2000s, and this revision continues to this day. Consequently, the subdivisions of this tribe have also undergone significant changes in recent years.

The higher level classification of Satyrine butterfly developed by Miller (1968) became the basis for later taxonomic studies. The work which based on adult morphology, recognised seven subfamilies in the family Satyridae: Haeterinae, Brassolinae, Biinae, Elymniinae, Eritinae, Ragadiinae and Satyrinae, and four tribes within Elymniinae: Lethini, Zetherini, Elymniini and Mycalesini. A later work, Harvey (1991), largely followed Miller's classification, but downranked the family Satyridae to the subfamily Satyrinae, with the consequent downranking of the subdivisions : subfamilies to tribes, tribes to subtribes, such as Elymniinae to the tribe Elymniini and Elymniini to the subtribe Elymniiti. In these classifications, Elymniinae/Elymniini was the second largest subgroup of Satyrine butterflies after Satyrinae/Satyrini. However, the morphological key characters that defined this group were not entirely definitive and the phylogenetic relationship of this group with other groups in the family/subfamily was confused.

The confusion over the taxonomy and phylogeny of Satyrinae is gradually being resolved by recent developments in molecular phylogenetic studies. Peña et al. (2006) was the first to develop a comprehensive phylogenetic hypothesis of Satyrinae since Miller, and showed that most of the families previously recognised were paraphyletic or polyphyletic. In the classification proposed in the work, Elymniini included only genus Elymnias, and the genera formerly included in that tribe, such as Lethe, Pararge and Mycalesis, were transferred to several tribes and subtribes, such as Lethina, Parargina and Mycalesina in Satyrini. Subsequent analyses have largely followed this same classification scheme, and also, all of the genera included in Elymniini by Miller were synonymized with Elymnias. Thus, the tribe Elymniini should include only a single genus Elymnias, according to current phylogenetic understanding.

However, this classification is still new and may not always be used in catalogs, picture books, etc. Moreover, phylogenetic analyses have not yet resolved the problems. For example, some analyses relate Hyantis and Morphopsis to this tribe, but others do not, therefore, it is not clear to which tribe these two genera should be placed in. In addition, several different hypotheses have been proposed for the phylogenetic relationship between the tribe Elymniini and other tribes within Satyrinae, thus there is no consensus on the phylogenetic position of this tribe in the subfamily.

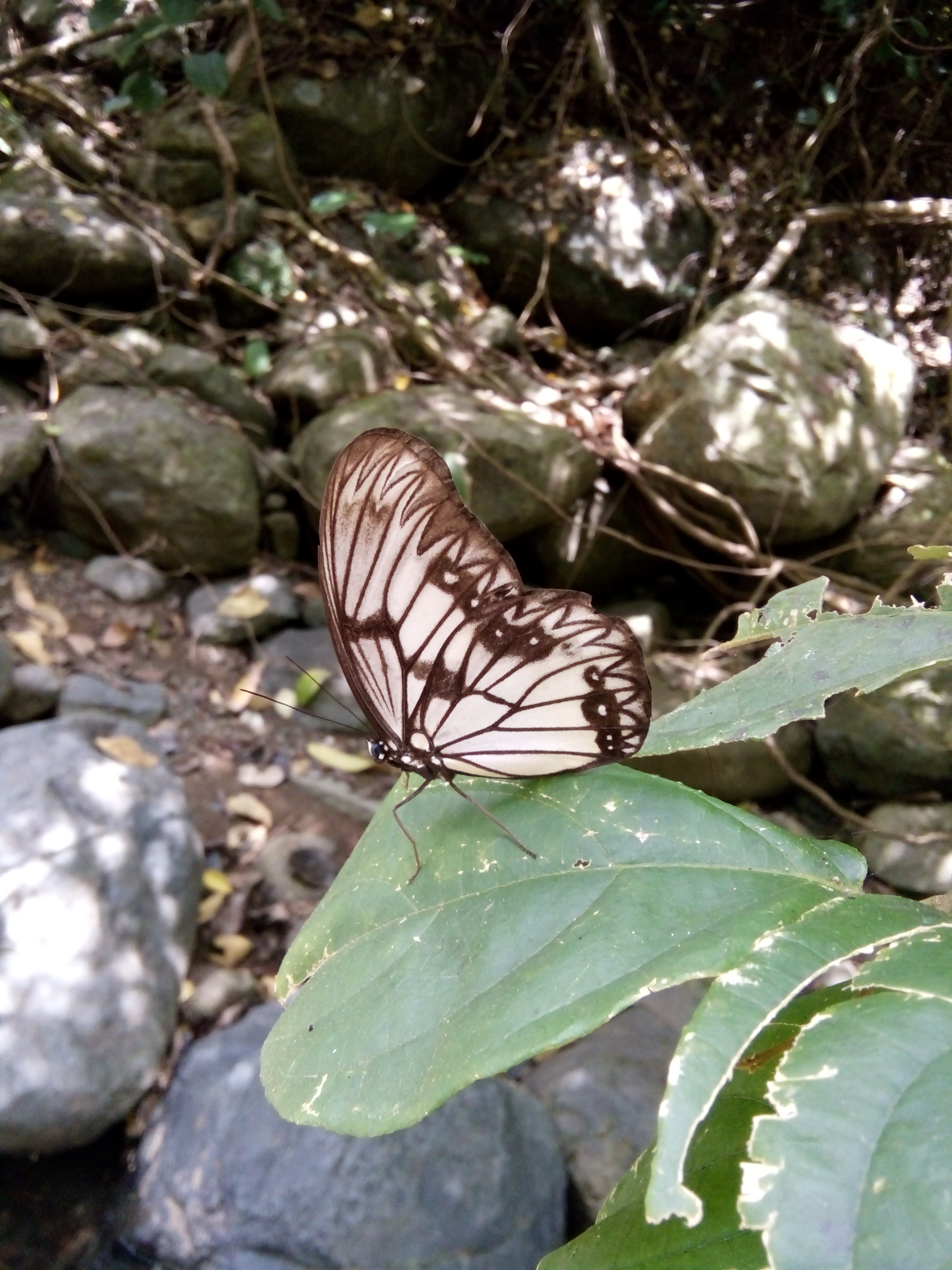
Zethera incerta, Indonesia

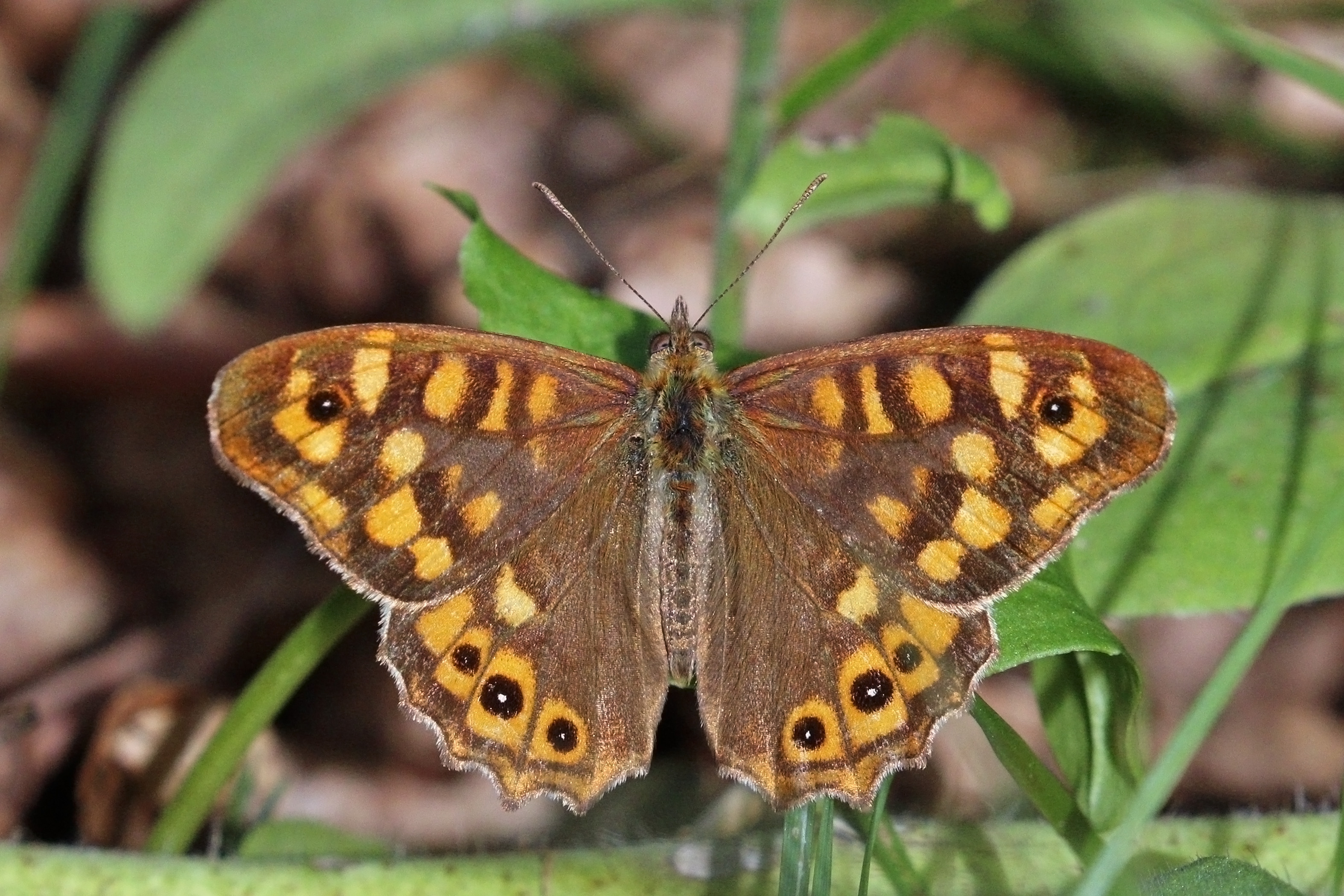
Pararge aegeria male, Portugal

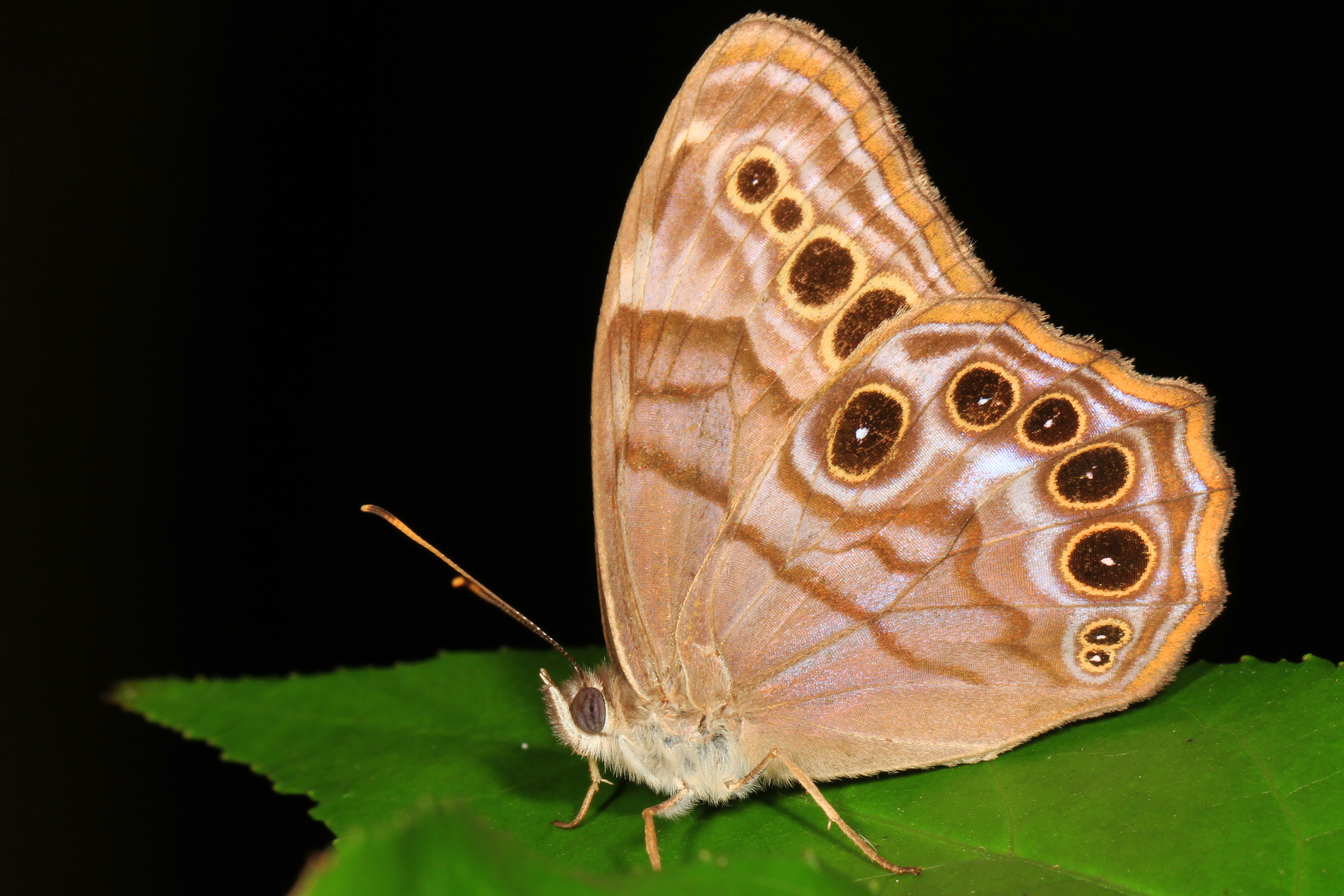
Lethe anthedon, Virginia, United States

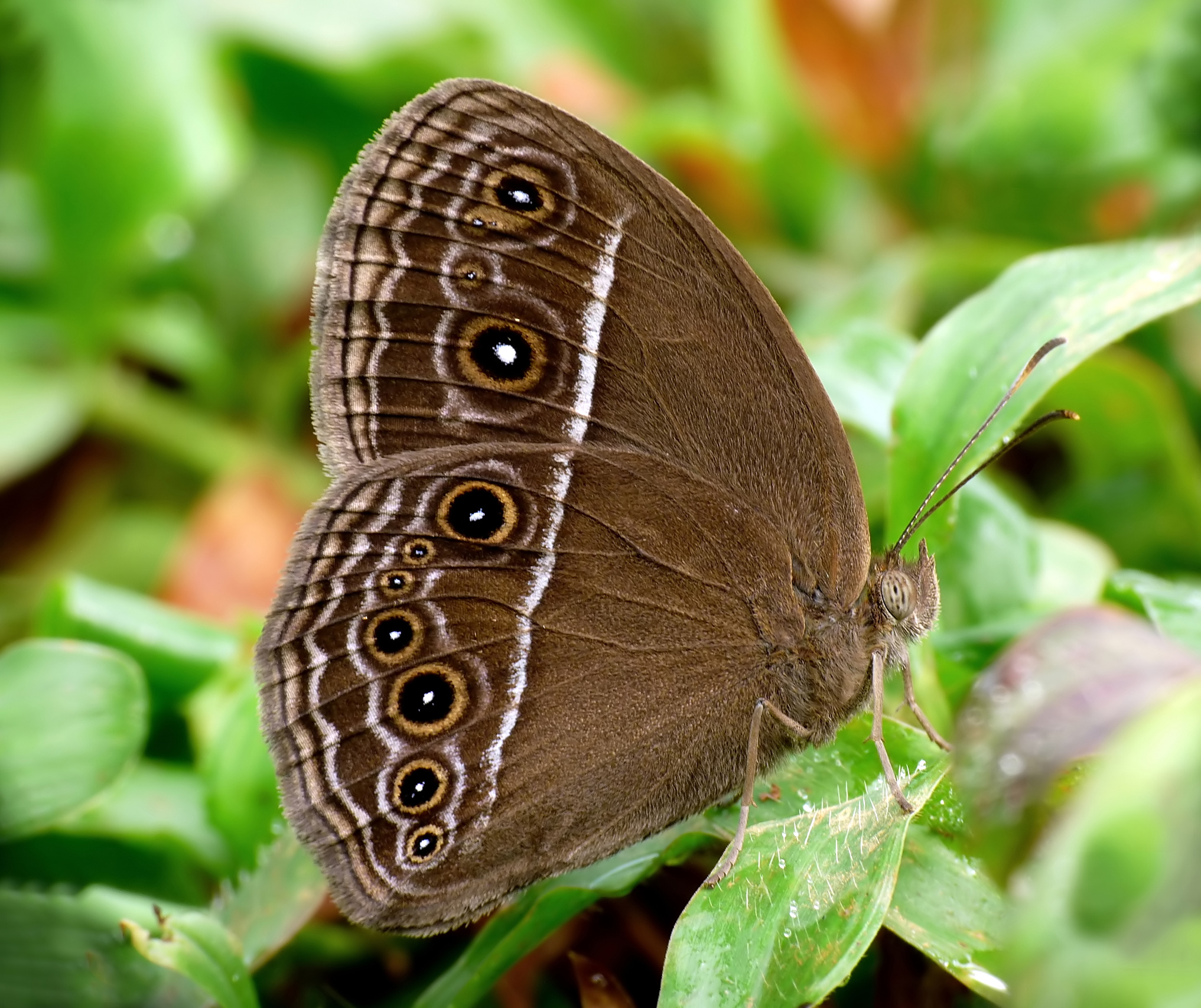
Mycalesis perseus, Kerala, India

Table for representative higher level classifications of satyrines in Peña et al. (2006) (excerpts with some modifications (Note: Only tribes related to this tribe are extracted and the format of the table are changed. In addition, Lamas (2004) was excluded because it only listed genera distributed in the Neotropics. Moreover, the genera Aeropetes and Paralethe which formerly related to this tribe, are not included here, because they have been re-transferred to another tribe (Dirini) since this study.))
	Miller (1968)		Harvey (1991)	Peña et al. (2006)
Family	Satyridae	Subfamily	Satyrinae	Satyrinae
Subfamily	Elymniinae	Tribe	Elymniini	Elymniini
Tribe	Elymniini	Subtribe	Elymniiti	Elymnias
Genera	Elymnias; Elymniopsis	Genera	Elymnias; Elymniopsis (Note: Elymniopsis has been synonymized with Elymnias.)	Elymnias
Tribe	Lethini	Subtribe	Lethiti	Elymnias
Genera	Enodia; Lethe; Neope; Satyrodes; Kirinia; Lasiommata; Lopinga; Pararge; Ethope; Neorina	Genera	Enodia; Lethe; Neope; Satyrodes; Kirinia; Lasiommata; Lopinga; Pararge; Ethope; Neorina	Elymnias
Tribe	Mycalesini	Subtribe	Mycalesiti	Elymnias
Genera	Bicyclus; Hallelesis; Henotesia; Mycalesis; Orsotriaena	Genera	Bicyclus; Hallelesis; Henotesia; Mycalesis; Orsotriaena	Elymnias
Tribe	Zetherini	Subtribe	Zetheriti	Elymnias
Genera	Zethera	Genera	Zethera	Elymnias
Genera	Zethera	Tribe	Zethera	Zetherini
Genera	Zethera	Genera	Zethera	Neorina; Penthema; Ethope; Zethera
Subfamily	Satyrinae	Tribe	Satyrini	Satyrini
		Subtribe		Parargina
		Genera		Kirinia; Lopinga; Lasiommata; Pararge
		Subtribe		Lethina
		Genera		Lethe; Enodia; Satyrodes; Neope
		Subtribe		Mycalesina
		Genera		Bicyclus; Hallelesis; Henotesia; Mycalesis
Tribe	Coenonymphini	Subtribe	Coenonymphiti	Coenonymphina
Genera	* Not mentioned on this page	Genera	* Not mentioned on this page	Orsotriaena (Note: Orsotriaena have been re-transferred to another subtribe (Eritina) in Satyrini since this study.)
Tribe	Hypocystini	Subtribe	Hypocystiti	Orsotriaena
Genera	* Not mentioned on this page	Genera	* Not mentioned on this page	Orsotriaena
