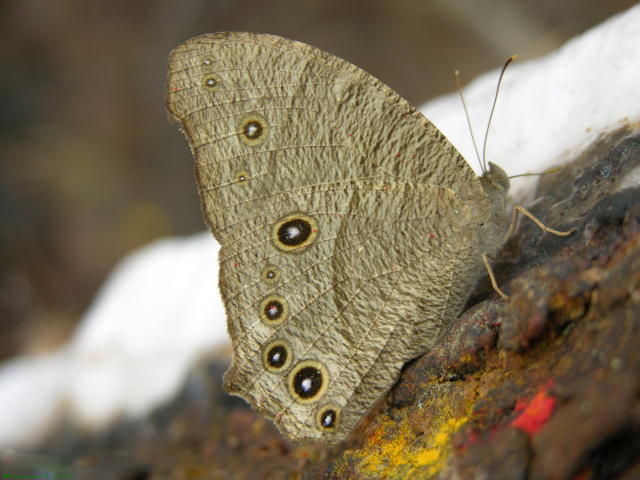
- Common evening brown (Melanitis leda)

Scientific classification
- Kingdom: Animalia
- Phylum: Arthropoda
- Clade: Pancrustacea
- Class: Insecta
- Order: Lepidoptera
- Family: Nymphalidae
- Subfamily: Satyrinae
- Tribe: Melanitini; Reuter, 1896

Genera
- About 7, see text

= Melanitini =

Tribe of butterflies

The Melanitini (evening browns and relatives) are one of the smaller tribes of the Satyrinae in the Nymphalidae (brush-footed butterfly) family. They contain the following genera:

- Aphysoneura Karsch, 1894 - sometimes placed in Elymniini
- Cyllogenes Butler, 1868
- Gnophodes Doubleday, 1849
- Haydonia Pyrcz & Collins, 2020
- Manataria (W.F. Kirby, 1902)
- Melanitis Fabricius, 1807
- Parantirrhoea Wood-Mason, 1881
