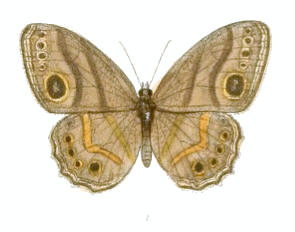
- Erites angularis

Scientific classification
- Kingdom: Animalia
- Phylum: Arthropoda
- Clade: Pancrustacea
- Class: Insecta
- Order: Lepidoptera
- Family: Nymphalidae
- Subfamily: Satyrinae
- Tribe: Eritini; Miller, 1968

Genera
- Coelites Westwood, 1850; Erites Westwood, 1851

= Eritini =

Tribe of butterflies

The Eritini are a small tribe of the Satyrinae in the Nymphalidae (brush-footed butterfly) family. This group contains a mere two genera.
