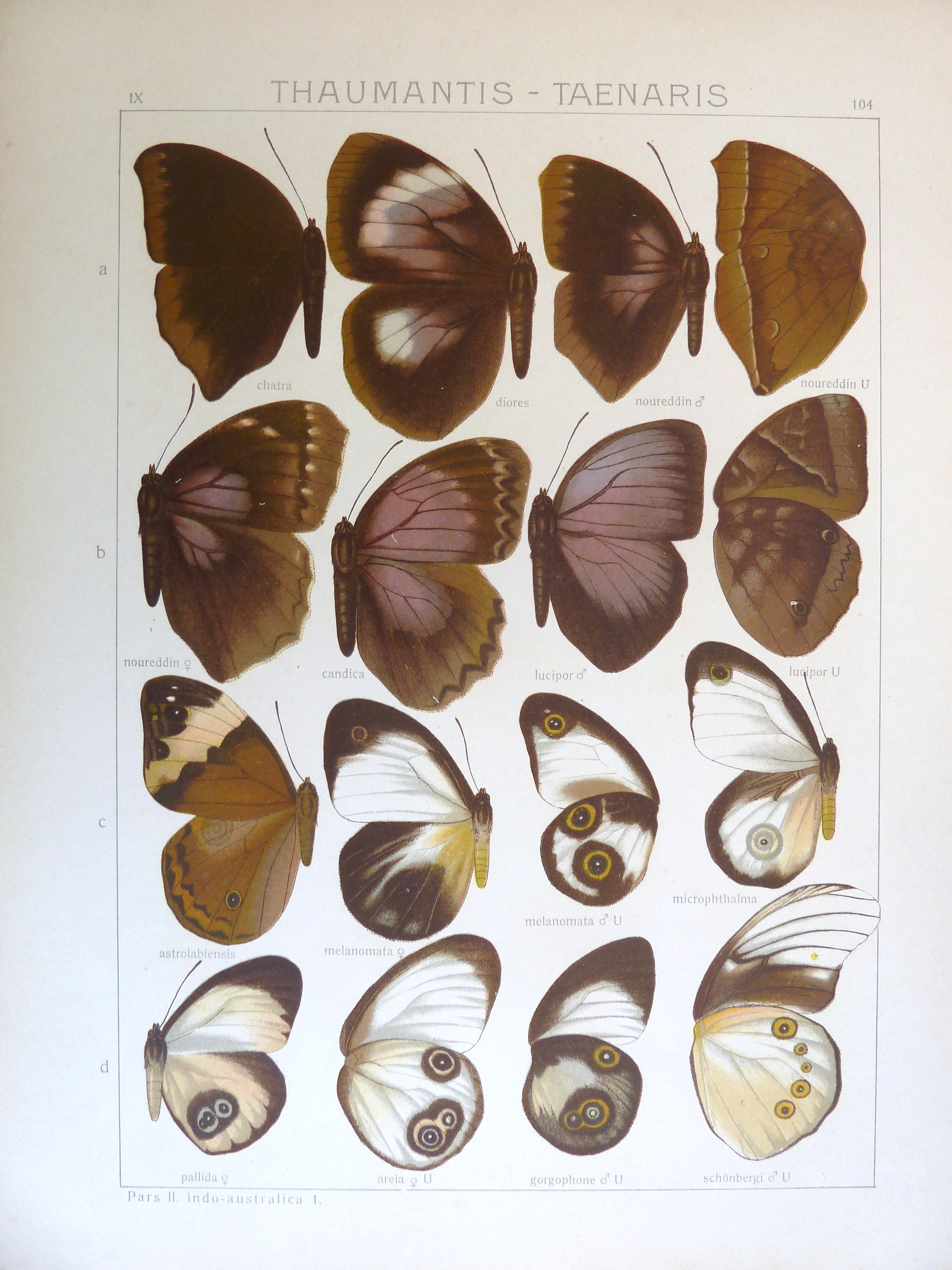
- Morphopsis albertisi astrolabiensis Stichel in Seitz

Scientific classification
- Kingdom: Animalia
- Phylum: Arthropoda
- Class: Insecta
- Order: Lepidoptera
- Family: Nymphalidae
- Tribe: Elymniini
- Genus: Morphopsis; Oberthür, 1880

= Morphopsis =

Genus of butterflies

Morphopsis is a genus of butterflies endemic to New Guinea.

== Species ==
- Morphopsis albertisi Oberthür, 1880
- Morphopsis biakensis Joicey & Talbot, 1916
- Morphopsis meeki Rothschild & Jordan, 1905
- Morphopsis phippsi Joicey & Talbot, 1922
- Morphopsis ula Rothschild & Jordan, 1905
