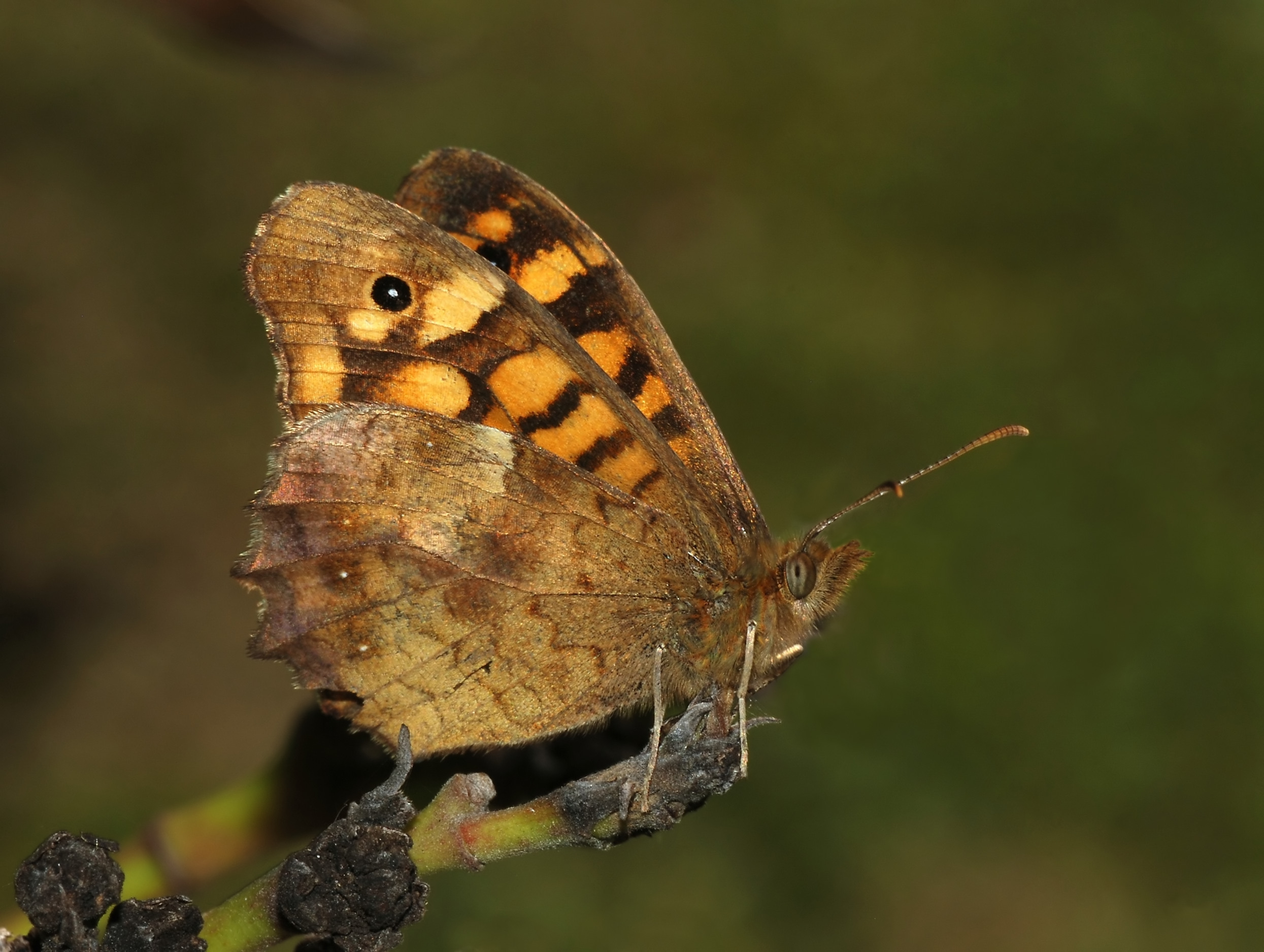
- Speckled wood, Pararge aegeria

Scientific classification
- Kingdom: Animalia
- Phylum: Arthropoda
- Clade: Pancrustacea
- Class: Insecta
- Order: Lepidoptera
- Family: Nymphalidae
- Subfamily: Satyrinae; Boisduval, 1833

Tribes
- Dirini; Eritini; Elymniini; Haeterini; Melanitini; Ragadiini; Satyrini and see text

Diversity
- Over 280 genera, some 2400 species

Synonyms
- Satyridae

= Satyrinae =

Subfamily of butterfly family Nymphalidae

The Satyrinae, the satyrines or satyrids, commonly known as the browns, are a subfamily of the Nymphalidae (brush-footed butterflies). They were formerly considered a distinct family, Satyridae. This group contains nearly half of the known diversity of brush-footed butterflies. The true number of the Satyrinae species is estimated to exceed 2,400.

== Overview ==
They are generally weak fliers and often shun bright sunlight, preferring moist and semishaded habitats. The caterpillars feed chiefly on monocotyledonous plants such as palms, grasses, and bamboos. The Morphinae are sometimes united with this group.

The taxonomy and systematics of the subfamily are under heavy revision. Much of the early pioneering work of L. D. Miller has helped significantly by creating some sort of order. Dyndirus (Capronnier, 1874) is a satyrid incertae sedis. Other than this genus, according to the latest studies on the classification of Nymphalidae, all satyrines have been assigned to one of the tribes, at least preliminarily. For detailed lists, see the tribe pages.
