= Piera (disambiguation) =

Piera refers to a municipality that covers a large portion of the southeastern corner of the comarca of Anoia in Catalonia, Spain. It may also refer to:

== People with the given name Piera ==
- Piera Aiello (born 1967), Italian police informant and politician
- Piera Aulagnier (1923–1990), French psychiatrist and psychoanalyst
- Piera Coppola (born 1968), American voice actress
- Piera Degli Esposti (1938–2021), Italian actress
- Piera Fatehial, Pakistani politician
- Piera Hudson (born 1996), New Zealander alpine skier
- Piera-Cassandra Maglio (born 1976), Italian footballer
- Piera McArthur (born 1929), New Zealand painter
- Piera Martell (born 1943), Swiss singer
- Piera Pistono (born 1938), Italian pianist and composer
- Piera Tizzoni (born 1940), Italian long jumper
- Piera Verri (1913–2006), Italian basketball player

== People with the surname Piera ==
- Fran Piera, Spanish footballer
- Nuria Piera (born 1960), Dominican journalist
- Vicente Piera (1903–1960), Spanish footballer
- Fermín Martín Piera (1954–2001), Spanish taxonomist
- Salva Piera (born 1991), Spanish field hockey player
- Josep Tomàs i Piera (1900–1976), Catalan lawyer and politician
- Julia Piera (born 1970), Spanish contemporary poet

== Other ==
- The Story of Piera, a 1983 Italian drama
- Haetera piera, a butterfly species
- La sombra de Piera, Venezuelan telenovela broadcast
- Piera Observatory, astronomical observatory
