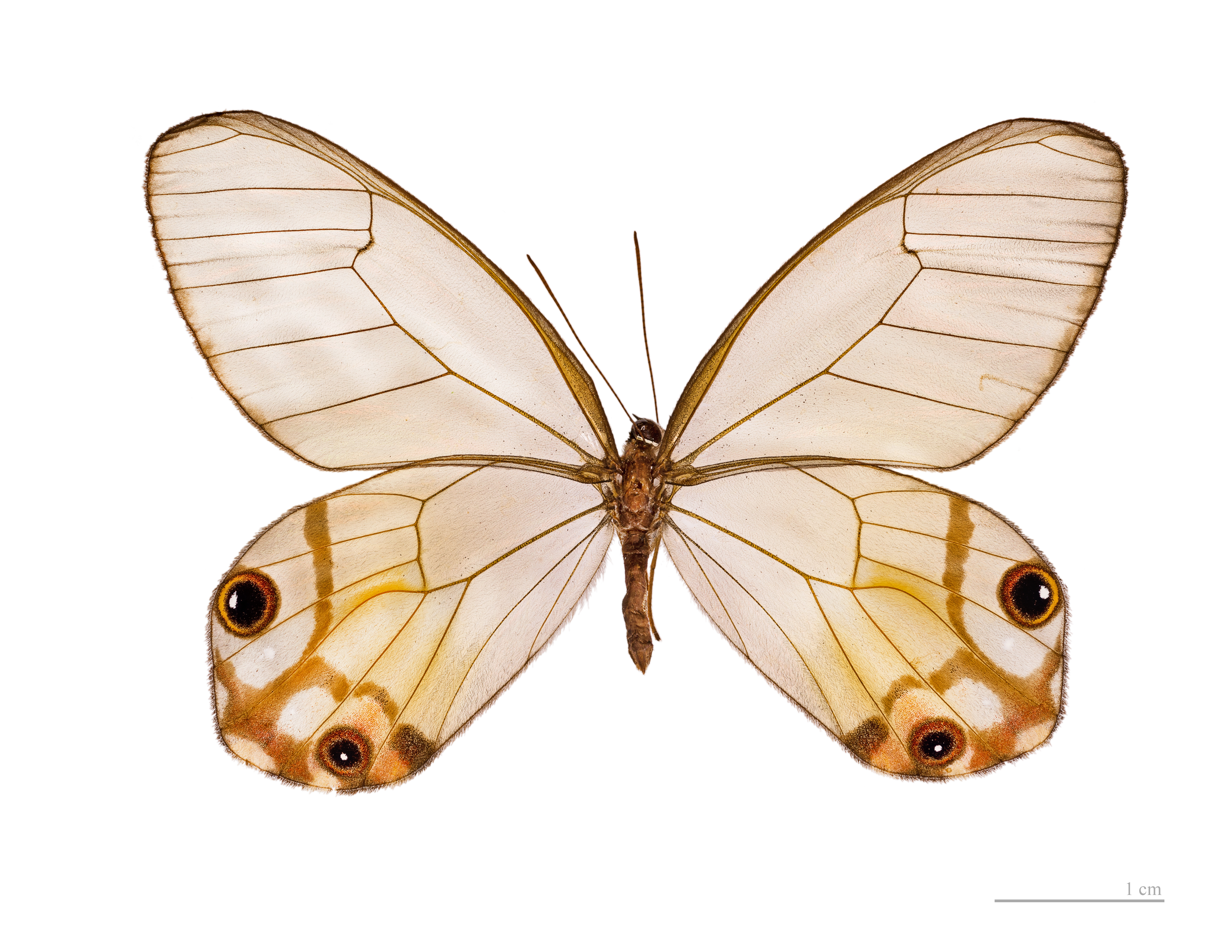
- Haetera piera

Scientific classification
- Kingdom: Animalia
- Phylum: Arthropoda
- Clade: Pancrustacea
- Class: Insecta
- Order: Lepidoptera
- Family: Nymphalidae
- Subfamily: Satyrinae
- Tribe: Haeterini; Herrich-Schäffer, 1864

Genera
- See text

= Haeterini =

Tribe of butterflies

The Haeterini are one of the smaller tribes of the Satyrinae in the Nymphalidae (brush-footed butterfly) family. The tribe occurs exclusively in tropical rain forests in the Neotropical realm.

It contains 29 described species and 39 subspecies (Note: But these estimates remain contentious, and at least 5 more species can be recognized based on the multispecies coalescent model as suggested by Matos-Maraví et al. (2019)) classified in the following five genera: (Note: According to TOLweb, Lepidoptera and Some Other Life Forms (Savela), Wikispecies, and nymphalidae.net Archived 8 December 2010 at the Wayback Machine which all seem to be based on Lamas, G. (2004).)

There are differences in the shape of the forewings between males and females, with males having wing shapes that are more efficient in gliding flight performance.

- Cithaerias Hübner, [1819]
- Dulcedo d'Almeida, 1951
- Haetera Fabricius, 1807
- Pierella Westwood, [1851] (Note: Markku Savela's Pierella page says this is invalid and the correct citation is Herrich-Schäffer, 1865, however no source is given for this conclusion and the LepIndex (among other sources) consider Westwood, [1851] to be correct.)
- Pseudohaetera Brown, 1942
