= EuroBasket Women 1938 squads =

This article displays the rosters for the teams competing at the EuroBasket Women 1938. Each team has to submit 10 players.

== France ==
France women's national basketball team - EuroBasket Women 1938 roster
Players
Coaches

Pos.	No.	Name	Age – Date of birth	Height	Club
		Marie-Antoinette Chabrel	–			(France)
		Lily Colin	–			(France)
		Jacqueline Dusoulier	–			(France)
		Jeanine Garnier	–			(France)
		Marie-Louise Gravier	–			(France)
		Margueritte Lafiteau	–			(France)
		Sokela Mangoumbel-Dietz	–			(France)
		Christiane Moreau	–			(France)
		Lisette Pariente	–			(France)
		Annette Roy-Bouligaud	–			(France)

Head coach

- (France)

Legend

- (C) Team captain
- nat field describes country
  of last club
  before the tournament
- Age field is age on October 12, 1938

== Italy ==
Italy Women's National Basketball Team — EuroBasket Women 1938 roster
Players
Coaches

Pos.	No.	Name	Age – Date of birth	Height	Club
		Bruna Bertolini	29 – 16 January 1909		Ambrosiana-Inter	(Italy)
		Nerina Bertolini	26 – 10 June 1912		Ambrosiana-Inter	(Italy)
		Giovanna Bortolato	25 – 1 March 1913		Guf Trieste	(Italy)
		Elsa Cenci	22 – 28 November 1915			(Italy)
		Anna Maria Giotto	23 – 4 September 1915			(Italy)
		Vittoria Ceriana Mayneri	23 – 18 April 1915			(Italy)
		Anita Falcidieno	22 – 18 August 1916			(Italy)
		Pia Punter	22 – 31 December 1915	1.80 m (5 ft 11 in)		(Italy)
		Flaminia Theodoli	24 – 4 January 1914			(Italy)
C		Piera Verri	25 – 23 September 1913		Audax Venezia	(Italy)

Head coach

- (Italy) Silvio Longhi

Legend

- (C) Team captain
- nat field describes country
  of last club
  before the tournament
- Age field is age on October 12, 1938

== Lithuania ==
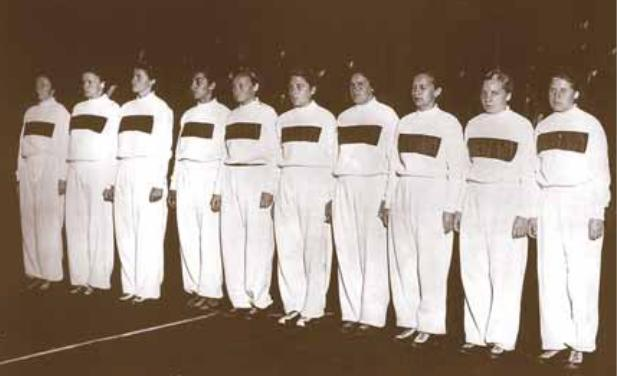
Lithuania women's national basketball team during EuroBasket 1938

Lithuania women's national basketball team – EuroBasket Women 1938 roster
Players
Coaches

Pos.	No.	Name	Age – Date of birth	Height	Club	Ctr.
		Stefanija Astrauskaitė	–			(Lithuania)
		Bronė Didžiulytė	–			(Lithuania)
		Juzė Jazbutienė	–			(Lithuania)
		Paulina Kalvaitienė	–			(Lithuania)
		Tatjana Karumnaitė	–			(Lithuania)
		Juzė Makūnaitė	–			(Lithuania)
		Stasė Markevičienė	–			(Lithuania)
		Genovaitė Miuleraitė	–			(Lithuania)
		Aldona Vailokaitytė	–			(Lithuania)
		Eleonora Vaškelytė	–			(Lithuania)

Head coach

- (Lithuania) Feliksas Kriaučiūnas

Legend

- (C) Team captain
- nat field describes country
  of last club
  before the tournament
- Age field is age on October 12, 1938

== Poland ==
Poland Women's National Basketball Team roster
Players
Coaches

Pos.	No.	Name	Age – Date of birth	Height	Club
		Halina Bruszkiewicz	–			(Poland)
		Irena Brzustowska	–			(Poland)
		Helena Filipiak	–			(Poland)
		Jadwiga Glazewska	–			(Poland)
		Helena Gruszczynska	–			(Poland)
		Edita Holfeier	–			(Poland)
		Irena Jasnikowska	–			(Poland)
		Irena Jaznicka-Kamecka	22 – 7 December 1915		Polonia Warszawa	(Poland)
		Zdzislawa Wiszniewska	–			(Poland)
		Helena Wojnarowska	–			(Poland)

Head coach

- (Poland) Mieczyslaw Piotrowski

Legend

- (C) Team captain
- nat field describes country
  of last club
  before the tournament
- Age field is age on October 12, 1938
