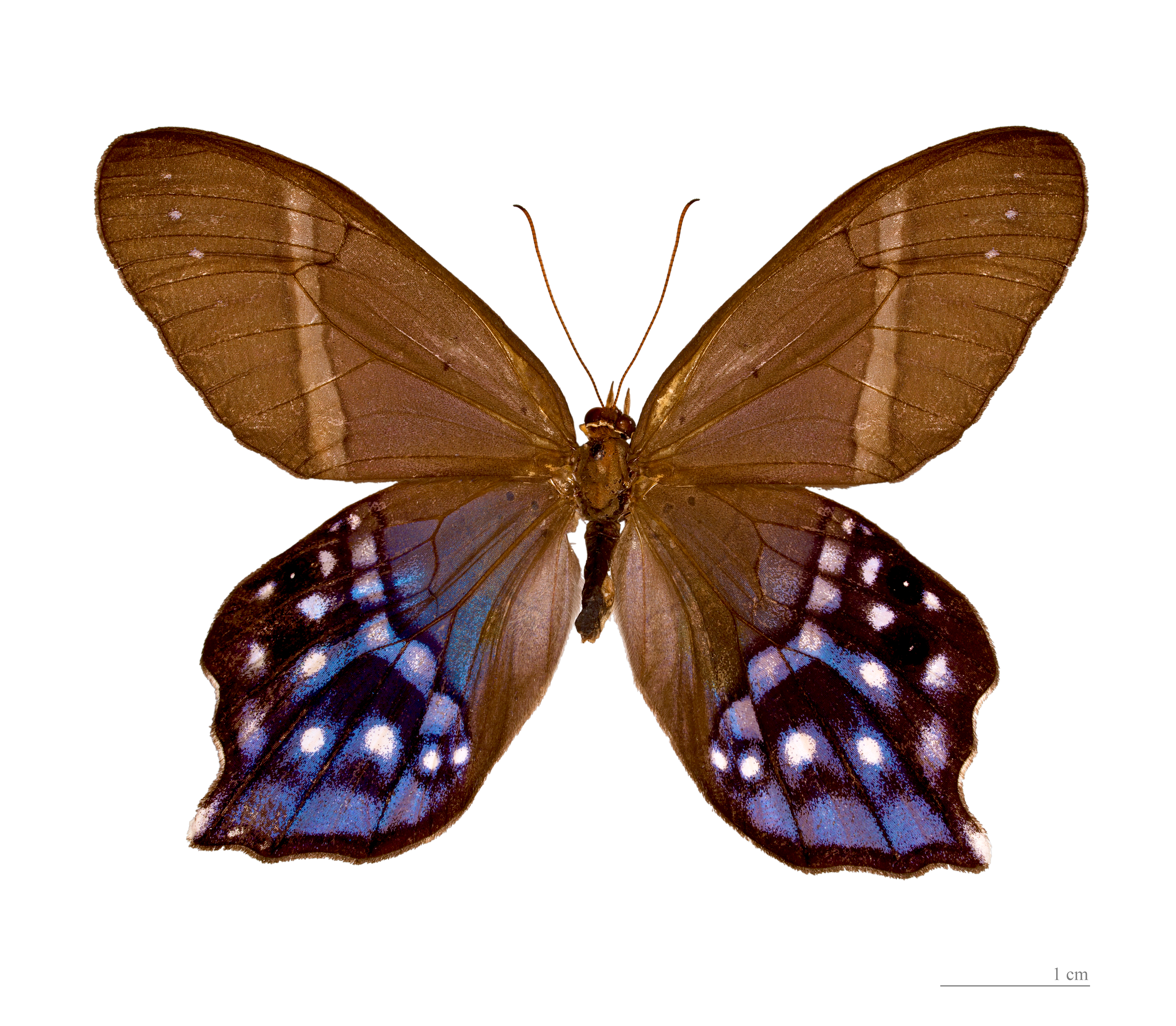
- P. hyalinus hyalinus

Scientific classification
- Domain: Eukaryota
- Kingdom: Animalia
- Phylum: Arthropoda
- Class: Insecta
- Order: Lepidoptera
- Family: Nymphalidae
- Genus: Pierella
- Species: P. hyalinus

Binomial name
- Pierella hyalinus (Gmelin, [1790])

Synonyms
- Papilio hyalinus Gmelin, [1790]; Pierella hyalina Brown, 1948; Pieris dracontis Hübner, [1819]; Pierella hyalinus fusimaculata F.M. Brown, 1948

= Pierella hyalinus =

Glassy pierella

Species of butterfly

Pierella hyalinus, the glassy pierella or the hyalinus pierella, is a species of butterfly in the brush-footed butterfly family Nymphalidae. It was first described by Johann Friedrich Gmelin in 1790.

== Description ==
Pierella hyalinus is visually similar to the related Pierella lena. Early researchers applied the moniker Pierella hyalinus to the insects found in the Amazon and Trinidad. M.P. Clifton was of the opinion that there existed a species complex between P. hyalinus and P. lena. P. hyalinus is differentiated from P. lena by the M3 terminal branch of the dorsal hindwing being prolonged, forming a sickle projection on the outer margin, and the marginal region with bluish scales.

== Subspecies ==
There are four known subspecies of Pierella hyalinus:

- Pierella hyalinus hyalinus (Gmelin, [1790]) (Suriname, Trinidad)
- Pierella hyalinus extincta Weymer, 1910 (Brazil)
- Pierella hyalinus schmidti Constantino, 1995 (Amazon Trapeze of Brazil, Colombia, and Peru)
- Pierella hyalinus velezi Constantino, 1995 (Guainía, Colombia)
