= Bruna Bertolini =

Italian basketball player and track and field athlete

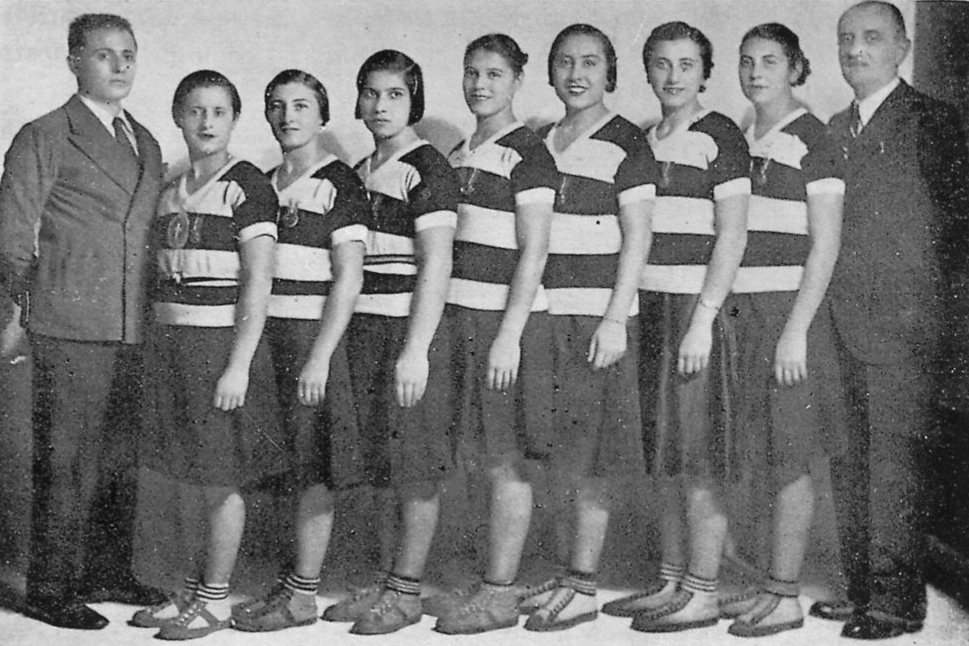
- Bruna, fourth basketball player from the left, next to her sister Nerina, fifth from the left.

Personal information
- Nationality: Italian
- Born: 16 January 1909 Trivolzio, Italy
- Died: unknown

Sport
- Country: Italy
- Sport: Athletics; Basketball
- Event(s): Discus throw Shot put Standing long jump
- Club: Canottieri Milano (basketball)
Medal record
Basketball
EuroBasket Women 1938
Gold medal – first place	1938 Rome	National team

Bruna Bertolini (16 January 1909 - date of death unknown) was an Italian basketball player, shot putter, discus thrower and long jumper, who won thirteen national championships at individual senior level from 1928 to 1937 in three different specialities, and gold medal at the EuroBasket Women 1938.

== Biography ==
Bertolini was the sister of Nerina Bertolini, player of the Italy women's national basketball team like her, The two sisters played together four national appearances at the EuroBasket Women 1938 that was held in Rome.

== National titles ==
Bruna Bertolini won 10 consecutive national titles in the shot put, and this is the record in Italy.

- Italian Athletics Championships
  - Standing long jump: 1931 (1)
  - Shot put: 1928, 1929, 1930, 1931, 1932, 1933, 1934, 1935, 1936, 1937 (10)
  - Discus throw: 1933, 1934 (2)

== See also ==
- EuroBasket Women 1938 squads
