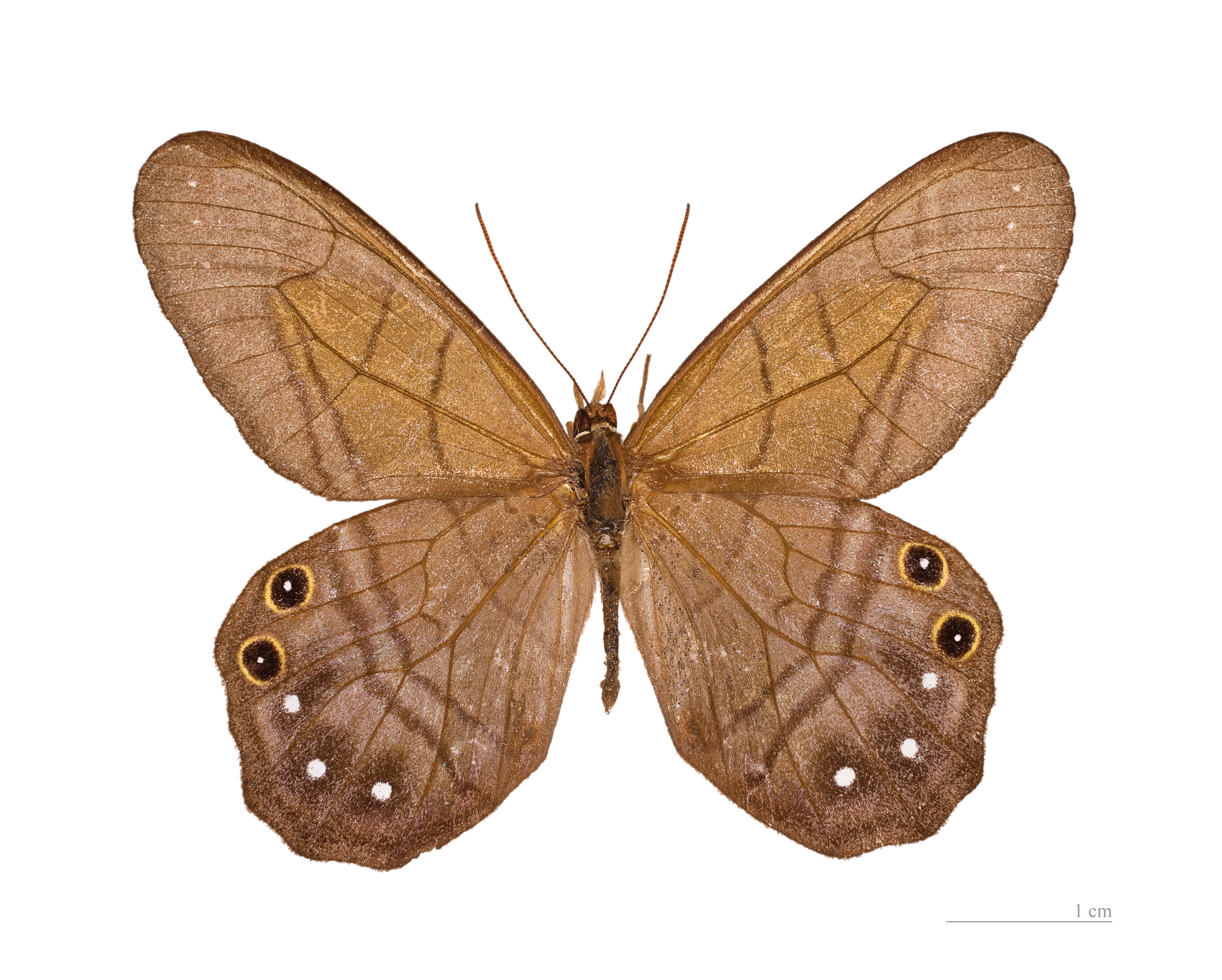

Scientific classification
- Domain: Eukaryota
- Kingdom: Animalia
- Phylum: Arthropoda
- Class: Insecta
- Order: Lepidoptera
- Family: Nymphalidae
- Genus: Pierella
- Species: P. astyoche

Binomial name
- Pierella astyoche (Erichson, [1849])

Synonyms
- Hetaera astyoche Erichson, [1849]; Haetera larymna Doubleday, [1849]; Pierella astyoche f. obscura Zikán & Wygodzinsky, 1948

= Pierella astyoche =

Astyoche satyr

Species of butterfly

Pierella astyoche, the Astyoche satyr, is a species of butterfly of the family Nymphalidae. It is found in South America.

== Subspecies ==
- Pierella astyoche astyoche (Guyana, Brazil: Pará)
- Pierella astyoche bernhardina Bryk, 1953 (Brazil: Amazonas)
- Pierella astyoche stollei Ribeiro, 1931 (Brazil: Rondônia)
