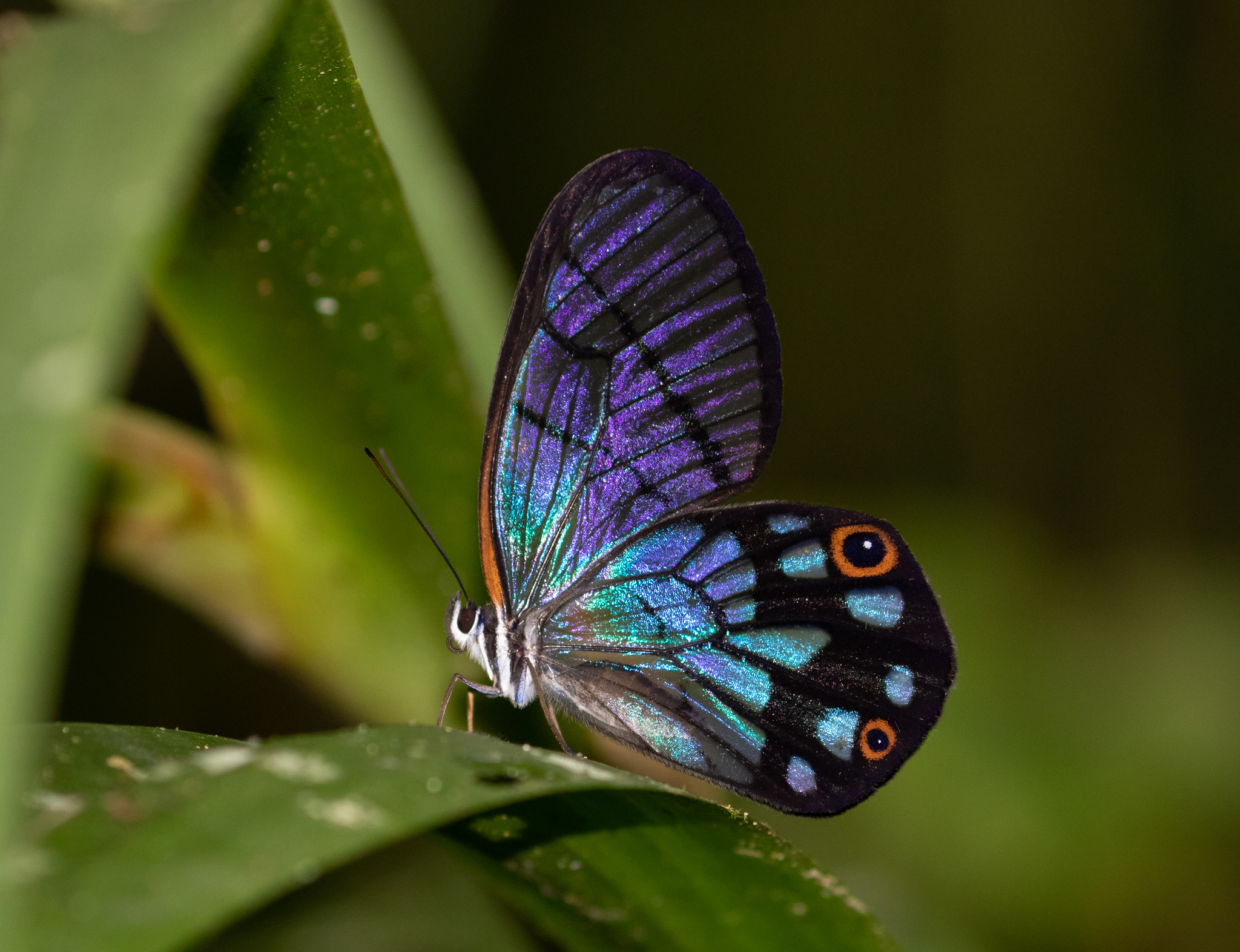
- Pseudohaetera mimica

Scientific classification
- Domain: Eukaryota
- Kingdom: Animalia
- Phylum: Arthropoda
- Class: Insecta
- Order: Lepidoptera
- Family: Nymphalidae
- Tribe: Haeterini
- Genus: Pseudohaetera; Brown, 1943

Synonyms
- Paradulcedo Constantine, 1992

= Pseudohaetera =

Genus of butterflies

Pseudohaetera is a Neotropical butterfly genus from the subfamily Satyrinae in the family Nymphalidae. The genus was described by F. Martin Brown in 1943.

== Species ==
- Pseudohaetera hypaesia (Hewitson, 1854)
- Pseudohaetera mimica (Rosenberg & Talbot, 1914)
