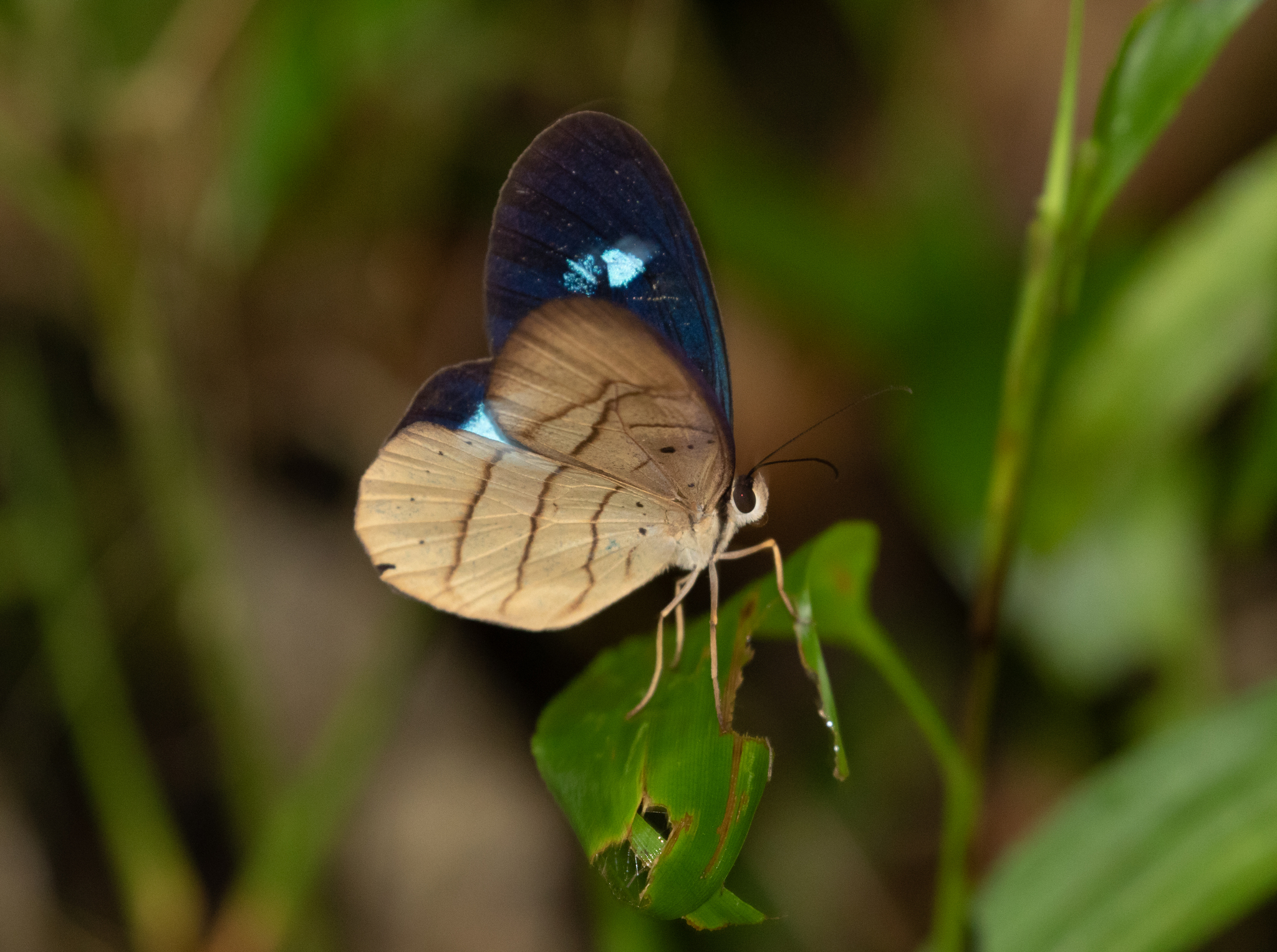

Scientific classification
- Domain: Eukaryota
- Kingdom: Animalia
- Phylum: Arthropoda
- Class: Insecta
- Order: Lepidoptera
- Family: Nymphalidae
- Genus: Pierella
- Species: P. hortona

Binomial name
- Pierella hortona (Hewitson, 1854)

Synonyms
- Haetera hortona Hewitson, 1854; Haetera hortensia C. & R. Felder, 1862; Pierella hortona f. albopunctata Brown, 1948; Pierella hortona f. ocellata Smart, 1975; Pierella albofasciata Rosenberg & Talbot, 1914; Pierella albofaciata decepta Brown, 1948

= Pierella hortona =

White-barred lady slipper

Species of butterfly

Pierella hortona, the white-barred lady slipper, is a species of butterfly of the family Nymphalidae. It is found east of the Andes in Ecuador, Brazil, Peru, and Bolivia. The habitat consists of rainforests and cloud forests at altitudes between 100 and 1600 m.

The larvae feed on Heliconia and possibly Calathea species.

== Subspecies ==
- Pierella hortona hortona (Brazil: Amazonas, Peru)
- Pierella hortona albofasciata Rosenberg & Talbot, 1914 (Peru, Bolivia)
