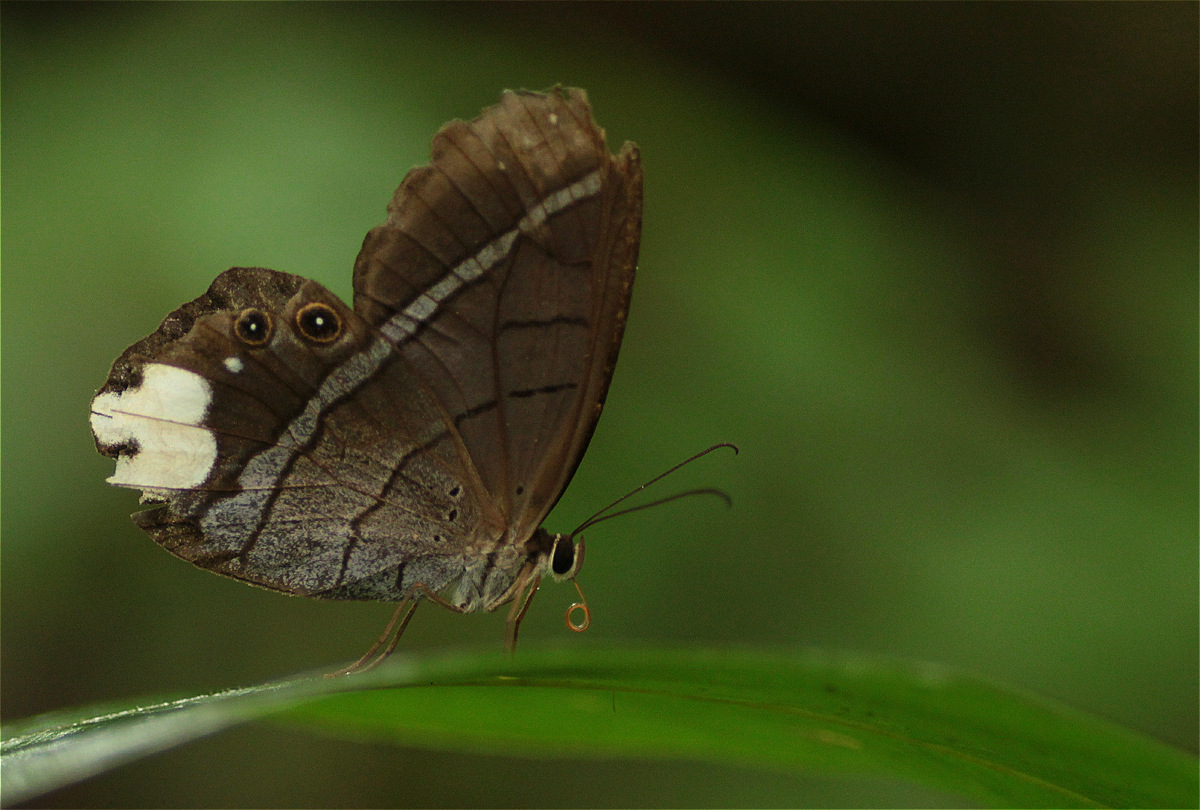

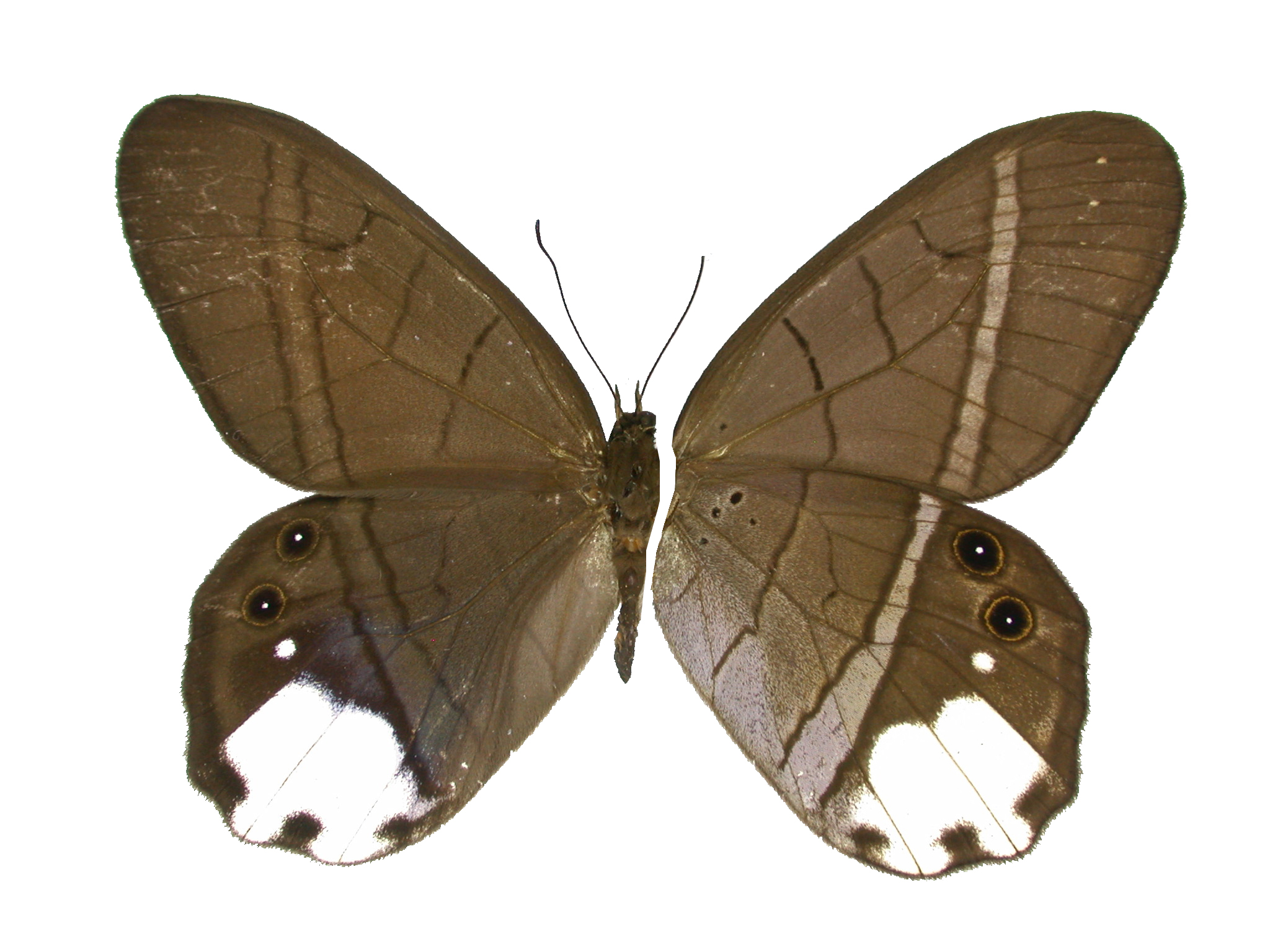

Scientific classification
- Kingdom: Animalia
- Phylum: Arthropoda
- Clade: Pancrustacea
- Class: Insecta
- Order: Lepidoptera
- Family: Nymphalidae
- Genus: Pierella
- Species: P. lucia

Binomial name
- Pierella lucia Weymer, 1885

Synonyms
- Pierella astyoche var. albomaculata Staudinger, 1887

= Pierella lucia =

Lucia pierella

Species of butterfly

The Lucia Pierella is a species of butterfly of the family Nymphalidae in the order Lepidoptera. It is found in Peru and Ecuador.
