= Julia Piera =

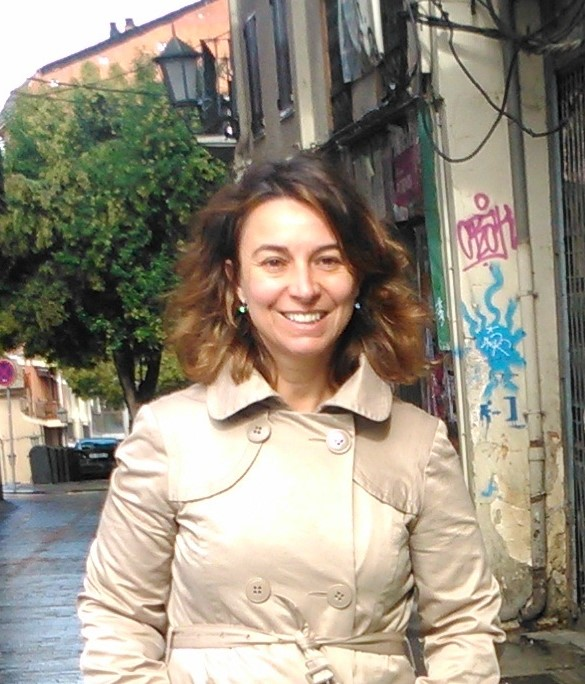

Julia Piera (born 1970, Madrid) is a contemporary poet. She is the author of the following books: Grinda y Mórdomo (Abada, 2020), Al vértice de la arena (Biblioteca Nueva, 2003), Igual que esos pájaros disecados (Hojas de Zenobia, Diputación de Huelva, 2004), Conversaciones con Mary Shelley (Icaria Editorial, Barcelona, 2006), Puerto Rico digital (Bartleby Editores, Madrid, 2009), and B de Boston (Olifante editions, 2019). She is the winner of the Villa de Madrid (Francisco de Quevedo) 2010 Poetry Prize for her book Puerto Rico digital.

== Biography ==
She holds a BA in Economics from the Universidad Complutense de Madrid and has an MA in Romance Languages and Literature from Harvard University. She is currently the director of the Colby College program in Spain.

Her poems have appeared in various magazines and publications such as El periódico de poesía (UNAM), El signo del gorrión, Can Mayor, ArteletrA, Galerna, and Samantarl Bhabna. Her work has also been included in anthologies Once de marzo, poemas para el recuerdo (Pre-Textos, 2004), Campo abierto (DVD, 2005), Poetas en blanco y negro contemporáneos (Abada, 2006), Complicidades (Ave del Paraíso Ediciones, 2008), Landing Places: Immigrant Poets in Ireland (Dedalus Press, 2010), Palabras sobre palabras: 13 poetas jóvenes de España (Santiago Inédito, 2010), Poetry from Spain for the 21st Century, edited by Forrest Gander (Shearsman Books, 2013), Sombras di-versas. Diecisiete poetas españolas actuales (Vaso Roto editions, 2017), and most recently Grand Tour: Reisen durch die junge Lyrik Europas (Hanser, 2019). During 2013 she participated in the transmedia project “Imagina cuántas palabras” in Spain. She has collaborated with the painter Jesús Ibáñez in the introductory text to his 2006-2007 exhibition at the Ansorena Gallery in Madrid. Some of her poems have been versioned into pieces by the experimental British composer Geoff Gould. Piera collaborates with the "El viajero" travel section of the Spanish newspaper El País.

== Poetry ==
- Grinda y Mórdomo (Abada, 2020)
- B de Boston (Olifante editions, 2019)
- Puerto Rico digital (Bartleby Editores, Madrid, 2009) - winner of the Villa de Madrid (Francisco de Quevedo) 2010 Poetry Prize
- "Al vértice de la arena", Arabic translation by Abdul Hadi Sadoun (Don Quixote, Damasco, 2011)
- Conversaciones con Mary Shelley (Icaria Editorial, Barcelona, 2006)
- Igual que esos pájaros disecados (Hojas de Zenobia, Diputación de Huelva, 2004)
- Al vértice de la arena (Biblioteca Nueva, 2003)

== Anthologies ==
- Grand Tour: Reisen durch die junge Lyrik Europas (Hanser, 2019)
- Sombras di-versas. Diecisiete poetas españolas actuales (Vaso Roto ediciones, 2017)
- Panic Cure: Poetry from Spain for the 21st Century, ed. Forrest Gander (Shearsman Books, 2013)
- Palabras sobre palabras: 13 poetas jóvenes de España (Santiago Inédito, 2010)
- Landing Places: Immigrant Poets in Ireland (Dedalus Press, 2010)
- Poeti spagnoli contemporanei (Edizioni dell'Orso, Alessandria, 2008)
- Complicidades (Ave del Paraíso Ediciones, 2008)
- Poetas en blanco y negro contemporáneos (Abada, 2006)
- Campo abierto (DVD, 2005)
- Once de marzo, poemas para el recuerdo (Pre-Textos, 2004)

== Translations ==
- Leer para ti (Reading to You) (co-authored with Chiara Merino) by Siri Hustvedt (Bartleby Editores, Madrid, 2007)

== Articles ==
- "Secretos literarios de Harvard" in El País (El viajero section), 25-10-2019
- "Viaje de Cork al Anillo de Kerry" in National Geographic Spain, ViajesNG nº 146, 2012
- "El ídolo de los orígenes" in El País (El viajero section), 22-6-2012
- "Niños y otros duendes" in El País (El viajero section), 9-4-2010
- "Lord Byron llegó en burro" in El País (El viajero section), 10-11-2007
- "La isla mujer, verde flotante" in El País (El viajero section), 21-04-2007
- "El fantasma de la Dama Blanca" in El País (El viajero section), 24 June 2006
- "Una flor para Emily Dickinson" in El País (El viajero section), 25 March 2006
