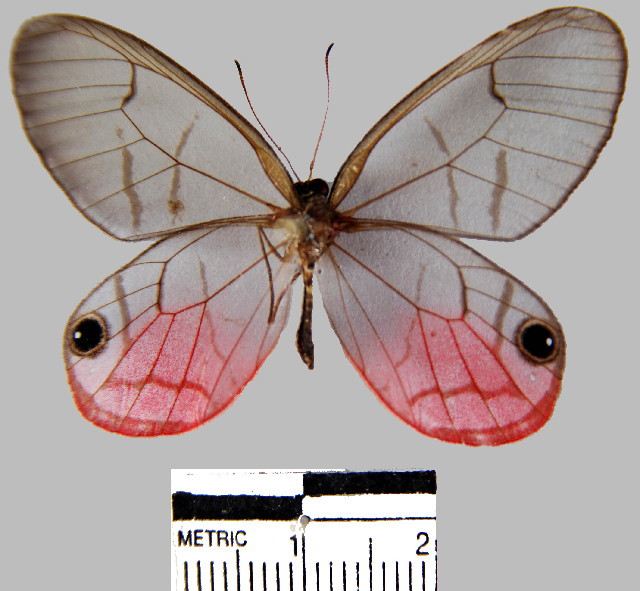

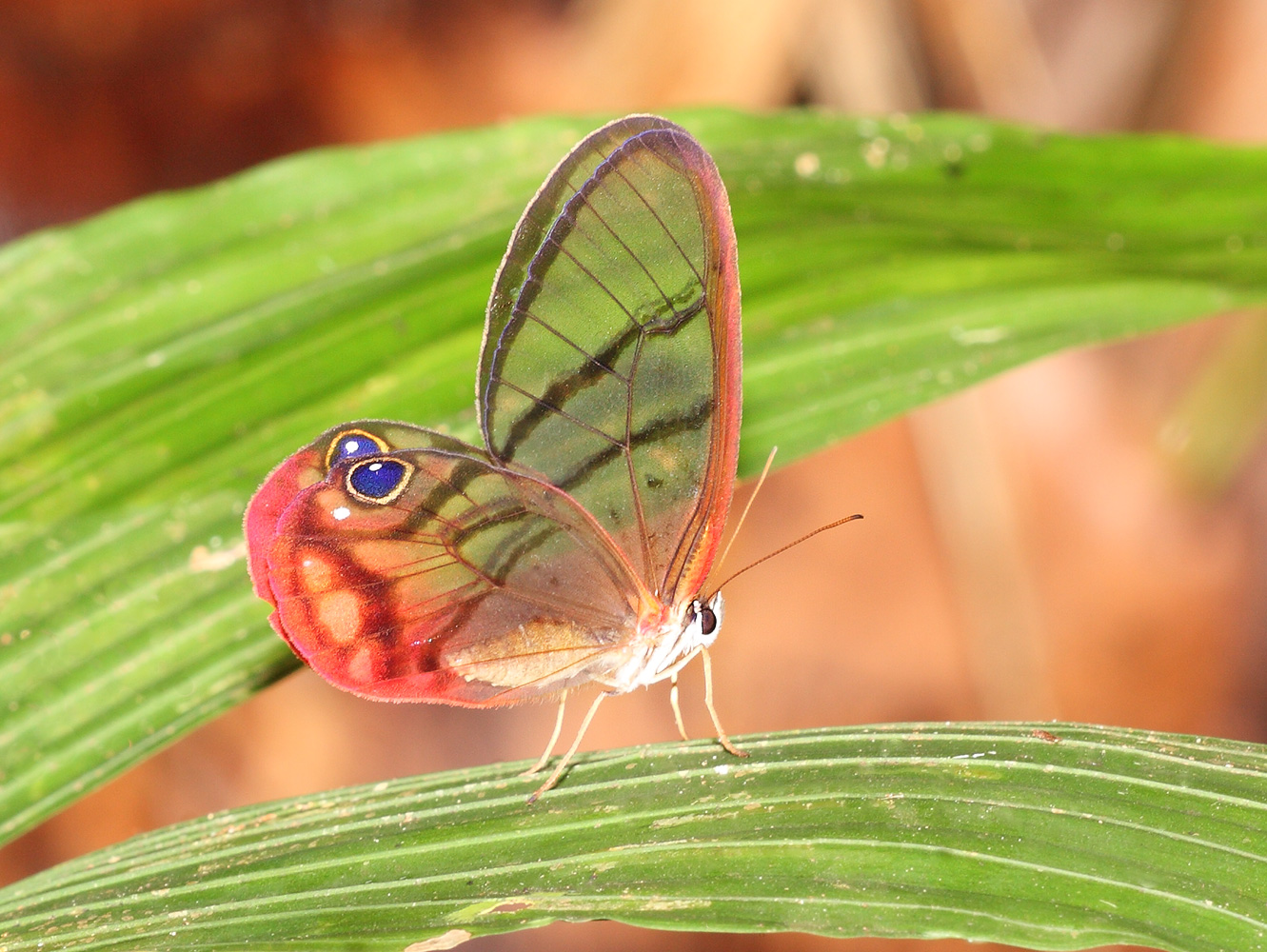

Scientific classification
- Kingdom: Animalia
- Phylum: Arthropoda
- Clade: Pancrustacea
- Class: Insecta
- Order: Lepidoptera
- Family: Nymphalidae
- Genus: Cithaerias
- Species: C. pireta

Binomial name
- Cithaerias pireta (Stoll, [1780])

Synonyms
- Papilio pireta Stoll, [1780]; Papilio menander Drury, 1782; Callitaera merolina Zikán, 1942; Cithaerias juruaensis d'Almeida, 1951

= Cithaerias pireta =

Blushing phantom

Species of butterfly

Cithaerias pireta, the blushing phantom, or the pink tipped glasswing satyr, is a species of butterfly of the family Nymphalidae. It is found from Mexico south to South America.

== Subspecies ==
- Cithaerias pireta pireta (Mexico to Colombia, Ecuador)
- Cithaerias pireta aurorina (Weymer, 1910) (Columbia, Brazil (Amazonas))
- Cithaerias pireta aura (Langer, 1943) (Brazil (Amazonas, Acre))
- Cithaerias pireta aurora (C. & R. Felder, 1862) (Peru)
- Cithaerias pireta magdalenensis Constantino, 1995 (Colombia)
- Cithaerias pireta tambopata Lamas, 1998 (Peru)
