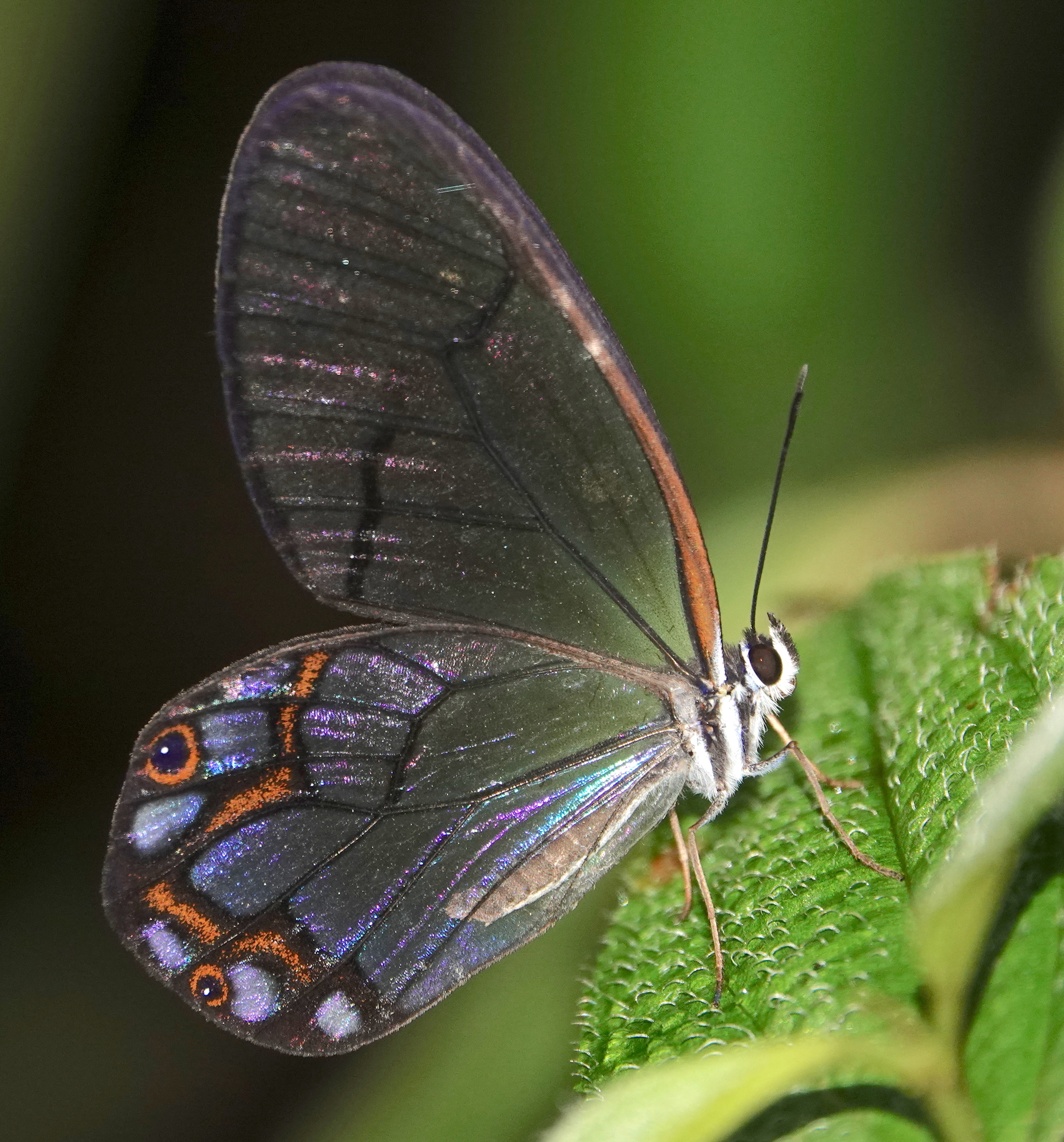

Scientific classification
- Domain: Eukaryota
- Kingdom: Animalia
- Phylum: Arthropoda
- Class: Insecta
- Order: Lepidoptera
- Family: Nymphalidae
- Genus: Pseudohaetera
- Species: P. hypaesia

Binomial name
- Pseudohaetera hypaesia (Hewitson, 1854)

Synonyms
- Haetera hypaesia Hewitson, 1854; Haetera hippomene Boisduval, 1870; Haetera f. strandi Niepelt, 1922

= Pseudohaetera hypaesia =

Species of butterfly

Pseudohaetera hypaesia, the hypaesia satyr, is a butterfly species from the subfamily Satyrinae in the family Nymphalidae.

== Description ==
Pseudohaetera hypaesia has a wingspan of about 105 millimetres (4.1 in). The uppersides of the wings are transparent with iridescent light reflections and the margins, except the inner margin of the anterior wing, are brown, while the nervure is black. The anterior wing is crossed obliquely from the lower discocellular nervule to the anal angle by a narrow band of brown. The posterior wings have the outer margin broadly bordered with purple brown, enclosing five irregular transparent spots, that near the apex larger than the rest, and intersected by a nervure. Two black eyespots are located upon the margin, with iris rufous and pupil white. The undersides of the wings are as above, with a light rufous band transversely through the brown border of the posterior wing above the white spots.

== Distribution ==
This species can be found in Colombia, Ecuador, Peru and Bolivia.
