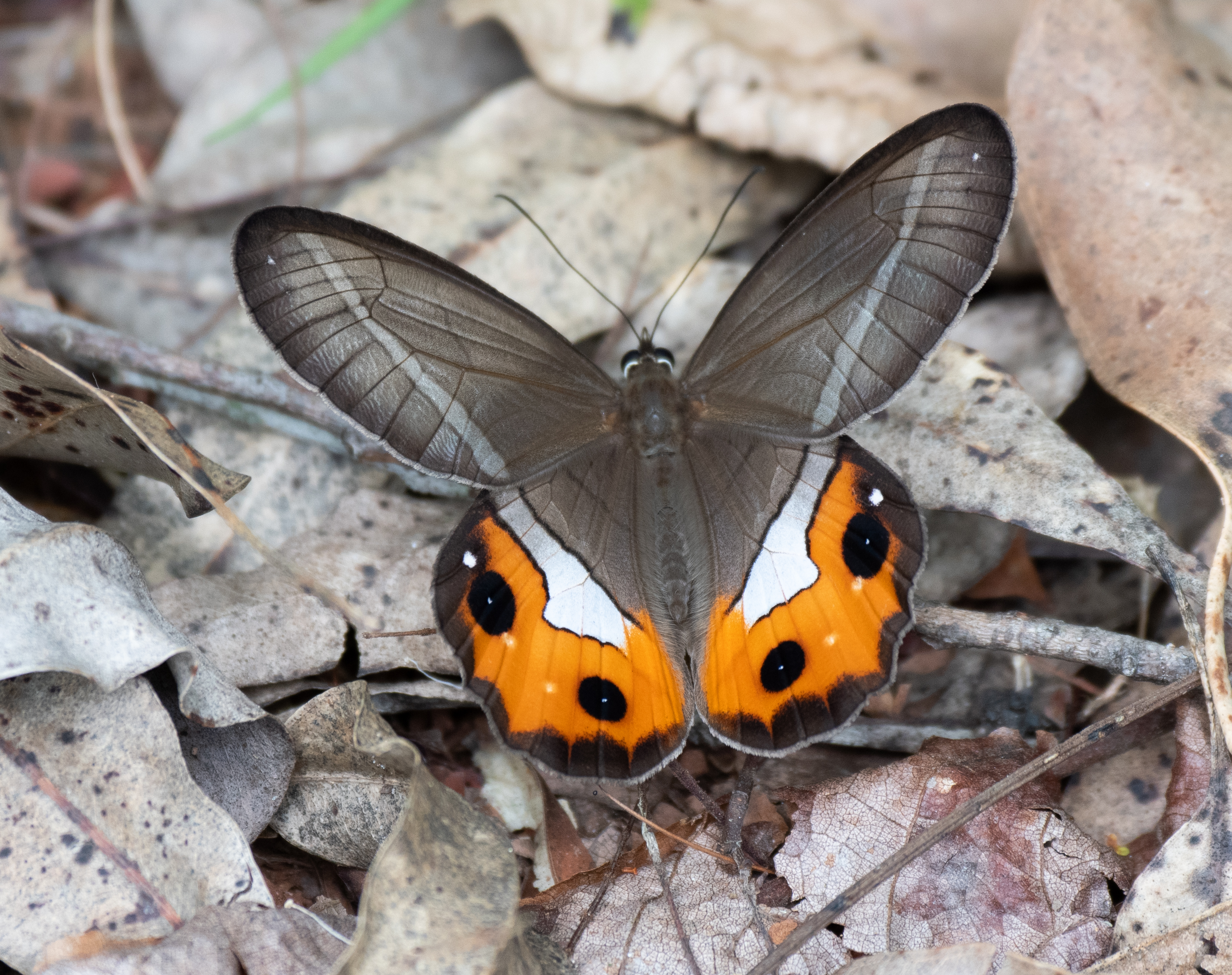

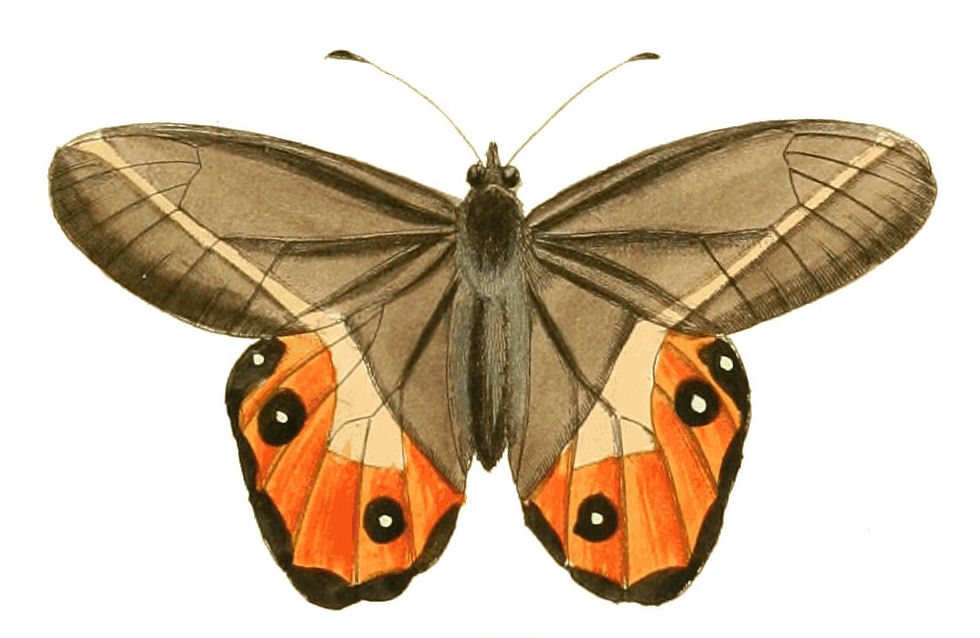
- Illustration by Dru Drury

Scientific classification
- Kingdom: Animalia
- Phylum: Arthropoda
- Class: Insecta
- Order: Lepidoptera
- Family: Nymphalidae
- Genus: Pierella
- Species: P. nereis

Binomial name
- Pierella nereis (Drury, [1782])

Synonyms
- Papilio nereis Drury, 1782

= Pierella nereis =

Species of butterfly

Pierella nereis is a butterfly species from the subfamily Satyrinae in the family Nymphalidae. It was first described by Dru Drury in 1782 from Brazil.

== Description ==
Upperside: Antennae black. Head, thorax, abdomen grey brown. Anterior wings grey brown, thin, and slightly diaphanous, with a small light-coloured bar running from the anterior edge near the tips to the posterior. Posterior wings having one-third next the body grey brown, divided by a line drawn across the wings from the anterior to the abdominal edges; next to this is an angulated white patch, the rest of these wings being orange coloured, with two black eyespots, having white centres, placed one at the upper, the other at the abdominal corners, the former having a small white spot joining to its upper part. The edges of these wings are bordered with dark brown.

Underside: Palpi, legs, breast, and abdomen cream coloured. Anterior wings next the tips tinged with red brown; the remainder of the wings being of the same colour as on the upperside. Posterior wings next the body pale clay, which occupies half the wings; below which is a white bar, the remainder of the wings being dark orange: the two black eyespots are very small on this side, and the white spot above them not so distinct. These wings are larger than is generally observed among insects of this tribe, and are dentated, the anterior ones being entire. Wingspan 3 inches (76 mm).
