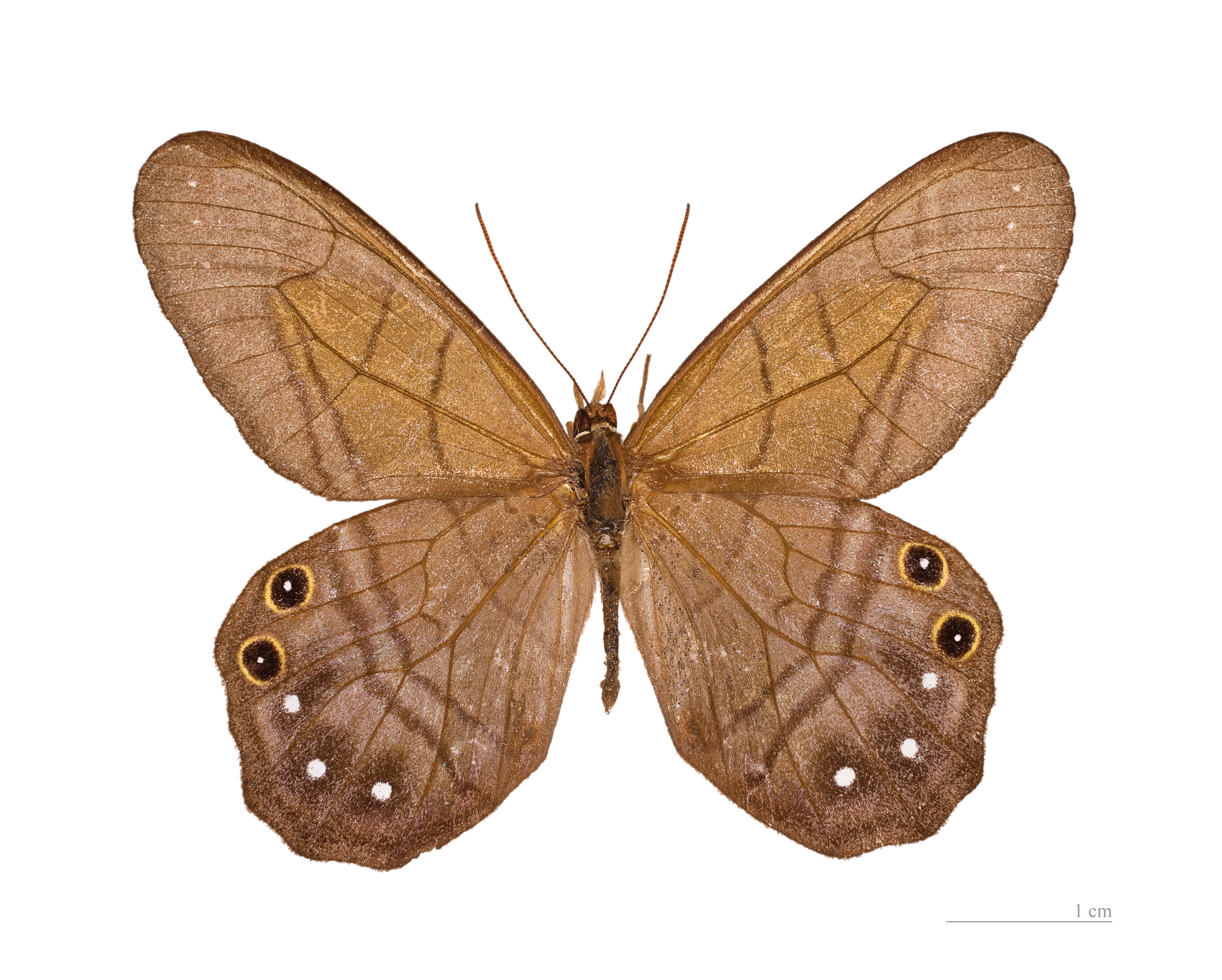
- Pierella astyoche
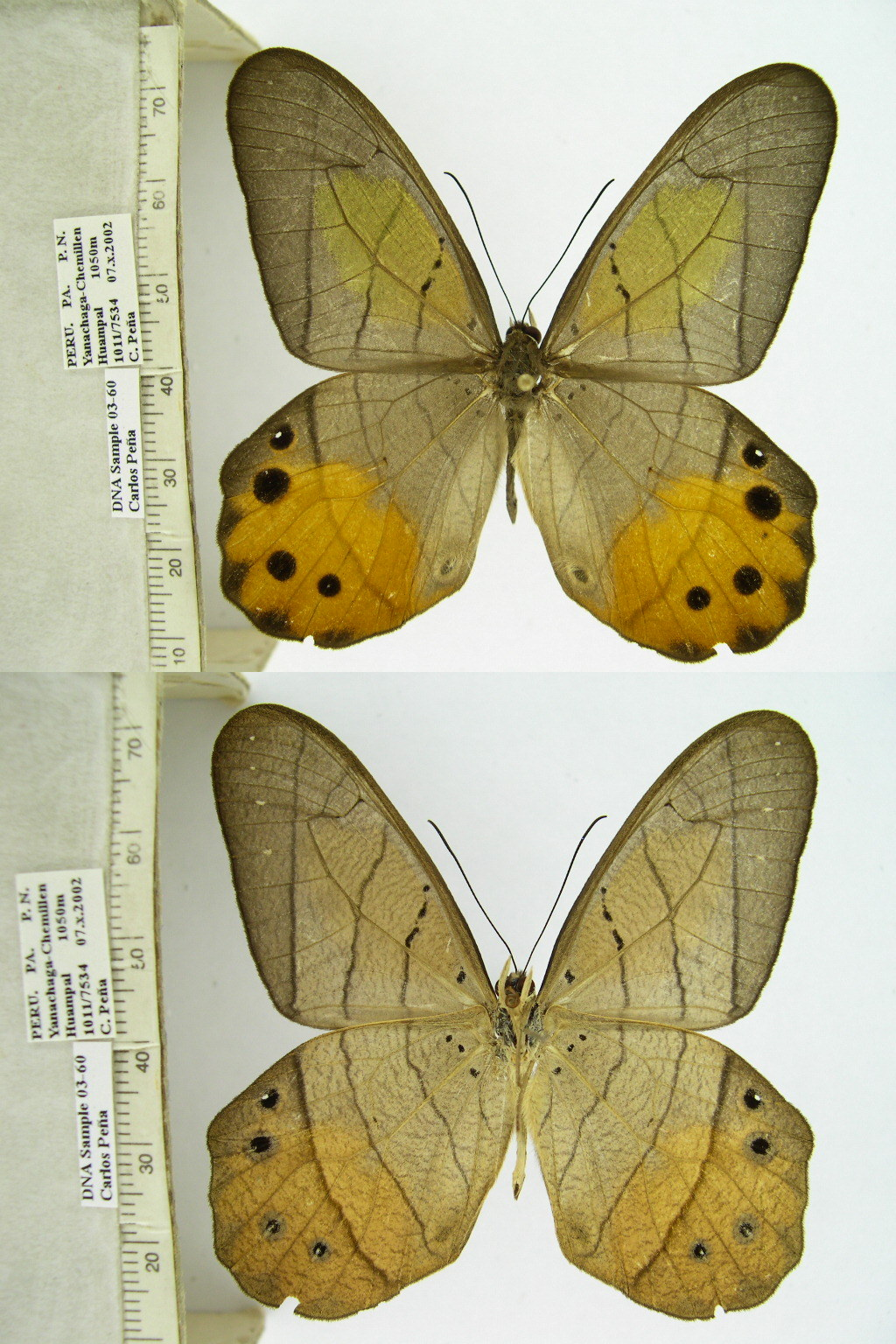
- Pierella hyceta angled to show the green flash

Scientific classification
- Kingdom: Animalia
- Phylum: Arthropoda
- Class: Insecta
- Order: Lepidoptera
- Family: Nymphalidae
- Tribe: Haeterini
- Genus: Pierella; Westwood, 1851

Type species
- Papilio nereis Drury, 1782

Diversity
- 11 species

Synonyms
- Antirrhaea Westwood, 1851; Pieris Hübner, [1819] (non Schrank, 1801: preoccupied)

= Pierella =

Genus of butterflies

Pierella is a butterfly genus from the subfamily Satyrinae in the family Nymphalidae found from Mexico through Central America to South America. The species of Pierella have larger hindwings than forewings, unique among butterflies. The oval green flash on the forewing is also unique. It is caused by diffraction, the wing scales forming a diffraction grating.

Their caterpillars have been found on the host plants Heliconia and Calathea.

== Species and subspecies ==
- Pierella amalia Weymer, 1885 (= P. lena ab. leucospila)
- Pierella astyoche (Erichson, [1849]) – Astyoche satyr
  - Pierella astyoche astyoche (= Haetera larymna, Hetaera [sic] astyoche)
  - Pierella astyoche bernhardina Bryk, 1953 (= P. astyoche f. obscura (nomen nudum))
  - Pierella astyoche stollei Ribeiro, 1931
- Pierella helvina (Hewitson, 1859)
  - Pierella helvina helvina (= Haetera helvina) – red-washed satyr
  - Pierella helvina hymettia Staudinger, [1886] (= P. incanescens werneri)
  - Pierella helvina incanescens Godman & Salvin, 1877 (= P. incanescens costaricana)
  - Pierella helvina ocreata Salvin & Godman, 1868 (= P. ocreata (nomen nudum))
  - Pierella helvina pacifica Niepelt, 1924 (= Pierello [sic] ocreata johnsoni)
- Pierella hortona (Hewitson, 1854) – white-barred lady slipper
  - Pierella hortona hortona (= Haetera hortensia, Haetera hortona, P. hortona f. albopunctata, P. hortona f. ocellata)
  - Pierella hortona albofasciata Rosenberg & Talbot, 1914 (= P. albofaciata [sic] decepta)
- Pierella hyalinus (Gmelin, [1790]) – glassy pierella
  - Pierella hyalinus hyalinus (= Papilio hyalinus, Pierella hyalinus fusimaculata, Pieris dracontis)
  - Pierella hyalinus extincta Weymer, 1910
  - Pierella hyalinus schmidti Constantino, 1995
  - Pierella hyalinus velezi Constantino, 1995
- Pierella hyceta (Hewitson, 1859) – golden lady slipper
  - Pierella hyceta hyceta (= Haetera hyceta)
  - Pierella hyceta ceryce (Hewitson, 1874) (= Haetera ceryce)
  - Pierella hyceta latona (C.Felder & R.Felder, 1867) (= Haetera latona)
- Pierella incanescens (Godman & Salvin, 1877)
- Pierella lamia (Sulzer, 1776) – Sulzer's lady slipper
  - Pierella lamia lamia (= Papilio dyndimene, Papilio lamia, Papilio rhea, Pierella lamia f. fabriciana, Pierella luna ab. albina)
  - Pierella lamia boliviana F.M.Brown, 1948
  - Pierella lamia chalybaea Godman, 1905 (= Haetera lamia f. columbina)
- Pierella lena (Linnaeus, 1767) – Lena pierella
  - Pierella lena lena (= Papilio lena, Papilio sectator)
  - Pierella lena brasiliensis (C.Felder & R.Felder, 1862) (= Haetera brasiliensis, P. lena browni, P. lena glaucolena, P. lena f. melanosa (nomen nudum), P. lena f. obsoleta)
- Pierella lucia Weymer, 1885 (= P. astyoche var. albomaculata) – Lucia pierella
- Pierella luna (Fabricius, 1793) – Moon Satyr
  - Pierella luna luna (= Papilio luna, Pierella luna f. rubra)
  - Pierella luna lesbia Staudinger, 1887
  - Pierella luna pallida (Salvin & Godman, 1868) (= Hetaera [sic] pallida)
  - Pierella luna rubecula Salvin & Godman, 1868 (= Haetera heracles)
- Pierella nereis (Drury, 1782) (= Papilio nereis)
