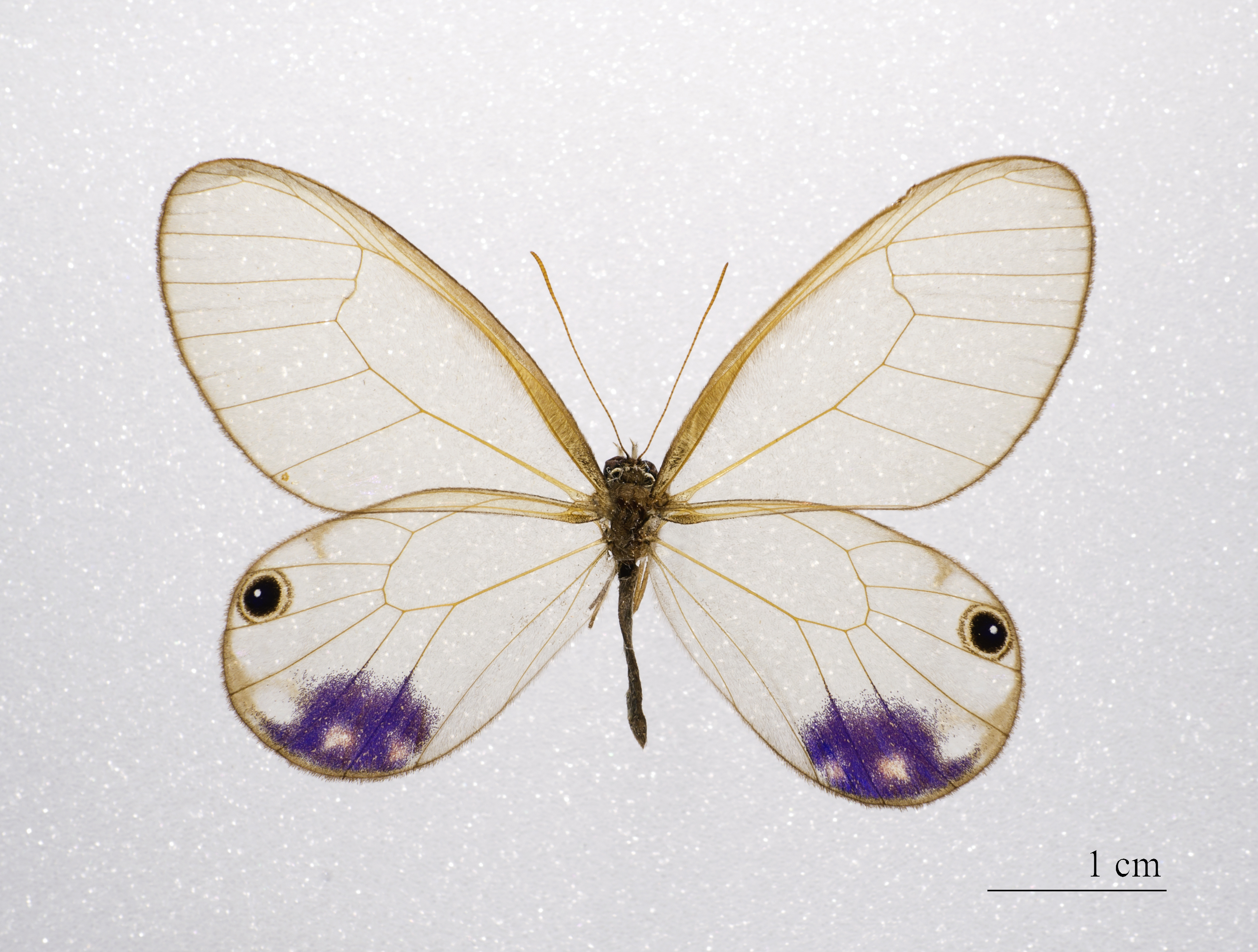
- Cithaerias andromeda esmeralda

Scientific classification
- Domain: Eukaryota
- Kingdom: Animalia
- Phylum: Arthropoda
- Class: Insecta
- Order: Lepidoptera
- Family: Nymphalidae
- Genus: Cithaerias
- Species: C. andromeda

Binomial name
- Cithaerias andromeda (Fabricius, 1775)

Synonyms
- Papilio andromeda Fabricius, 1775; Papilio philis Stoll, 1782 (preocc. Fabricius, 1775); Cithaerias cissa Hübner, [1819]; Hetaera pellucida Butler, 1866; Hetaera phelis Butler, 1866; Hetaera harpalyce Butler, 1866; Callitaera pellucida f. archeops Le Cerf, 1927; Callitaera philis f. hyacinthina Langer, 1943; Haetera esmeralda Doubleday, 1845; Callitaera rubina Fassl, 1922

= Cithaerias andromeda =

Andromeda satyr

Species of butterfly

Cithaerias andromeda, the Andromeda satyr, is a species of butterfly of the family Nymphalidae. It is found from Suriname, French Guiana, Venezuela, Peru, Bolivia and Brazil.

== Subspecies ==
- Cithaerias andromeda andromeda (Suriname, French Guiana, Venezuela, Peru, Bolivia, Brazil: Pará)
- Cithaerias andromeda esmeralda Doubleday, 1845 (Brazil: Pará)
- Cithaerias andromeda bandusia Staudinger, [1887] (Brazil: Amazonas)
- Cithaerias andromeda azurina (Zikán, 1942) (Brazil: Amazonas)
