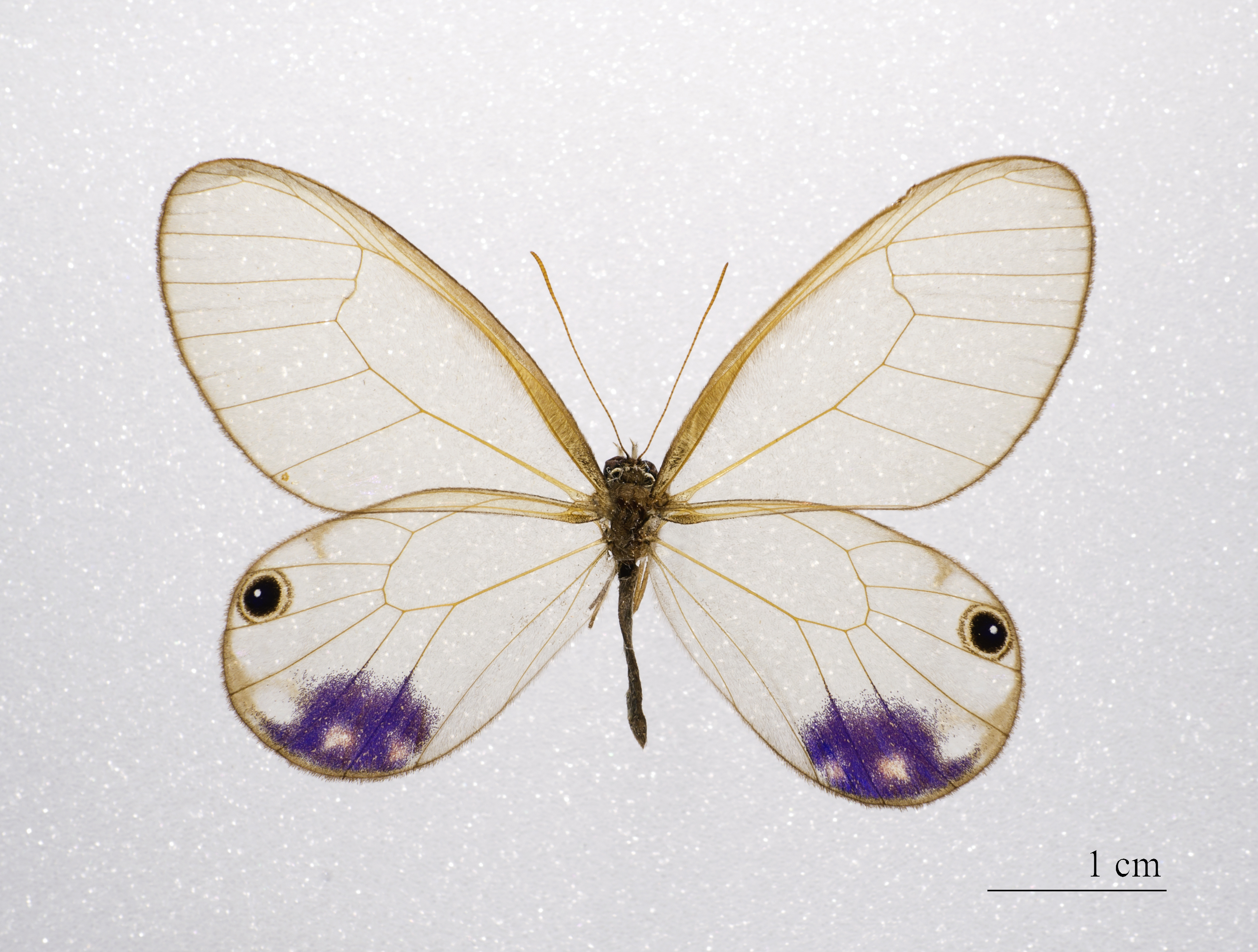
- Cithaerias andromeda esmeralda
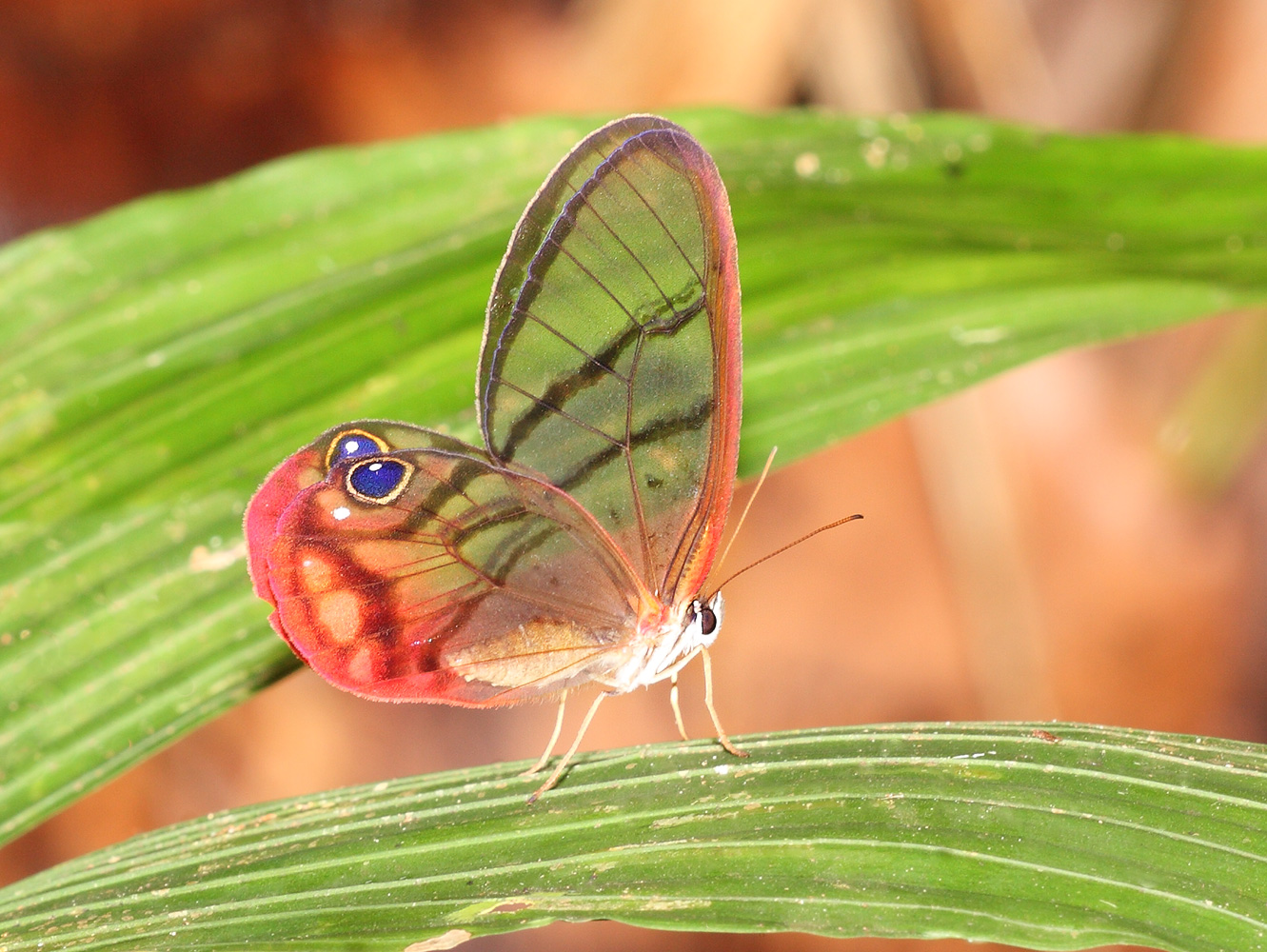
- Cithaerias pireta, Costa Rica

Scientific classification
- Domain: Eukaryota
- Kingdom: Animalia
- Phylum: Arthropoda
- Class: Insecta
- Order: Lepidoptera
- Family: Nymphalidae
- Tribe: Haeterini
- Genus: Cithaerias; Hübner, [1819]

Synonyms
- Callitaera Butler, 1868

= Cithaerias =

Genus of butterflies

Cithaerias is a Neotropical butterfly genus from the subfamily Satyrinae in the family Nymphalidae.

== Species ==
- Cithaerias andromeda (Fabricius, 1775)
- Cithaerias aurora (C. Felder & R. Felder) including Cithaerias phantoma (Fassl, 1922)
- Cithaerias aurorina
- Cithaerias azurina
- Cithaerias bandusia
- Cithaerias cliftoni
- Cithaerias esmeralda
- Cithaerias pireta (Stoll, [1780])
- Cithaerias pyritosa (Zikán, 1942)
- Cithaerias pyropina (Salvin & Godman, 1868)
- Cithaerias songoana
