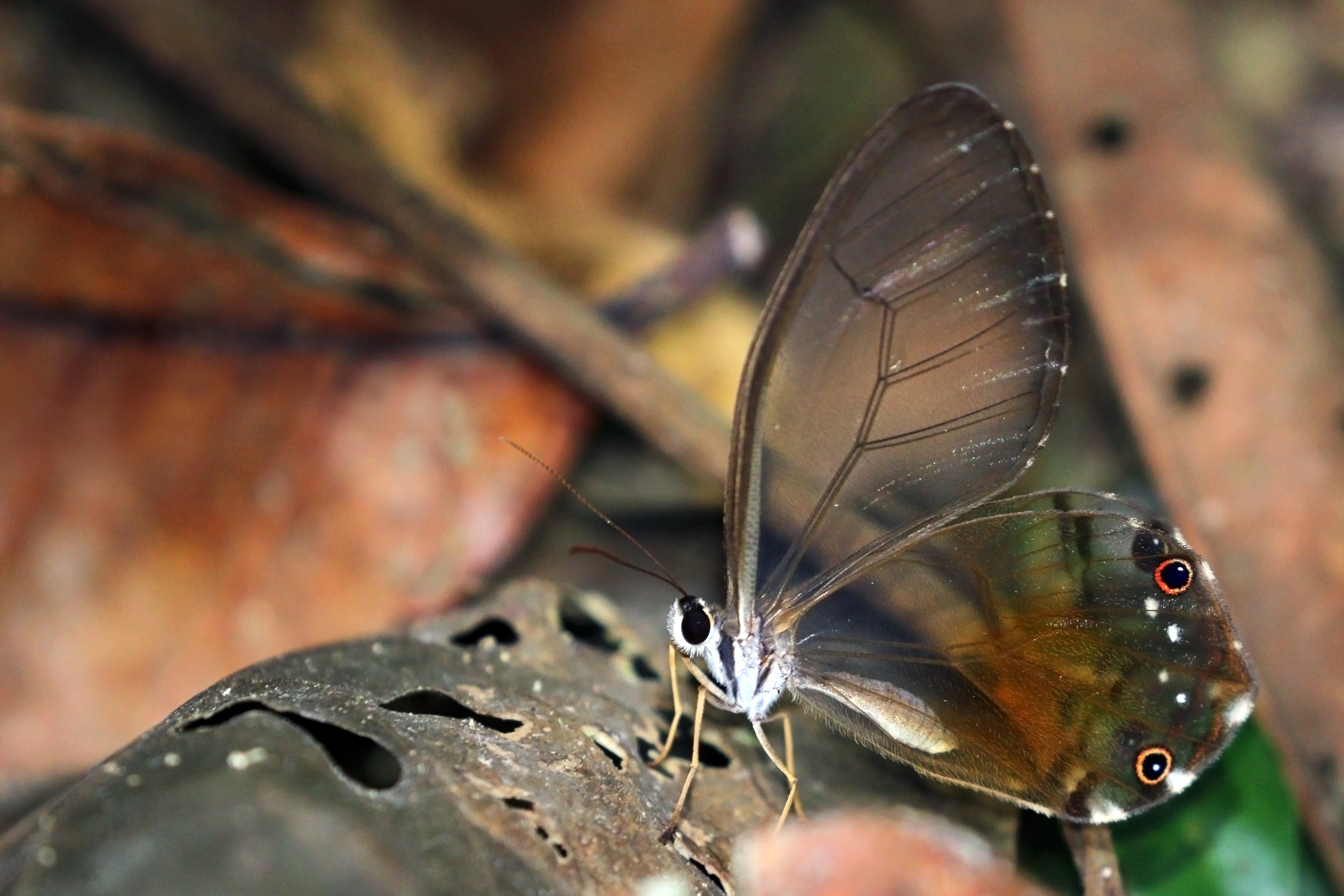
- Amber phantom Haetera piera negra, Brazil
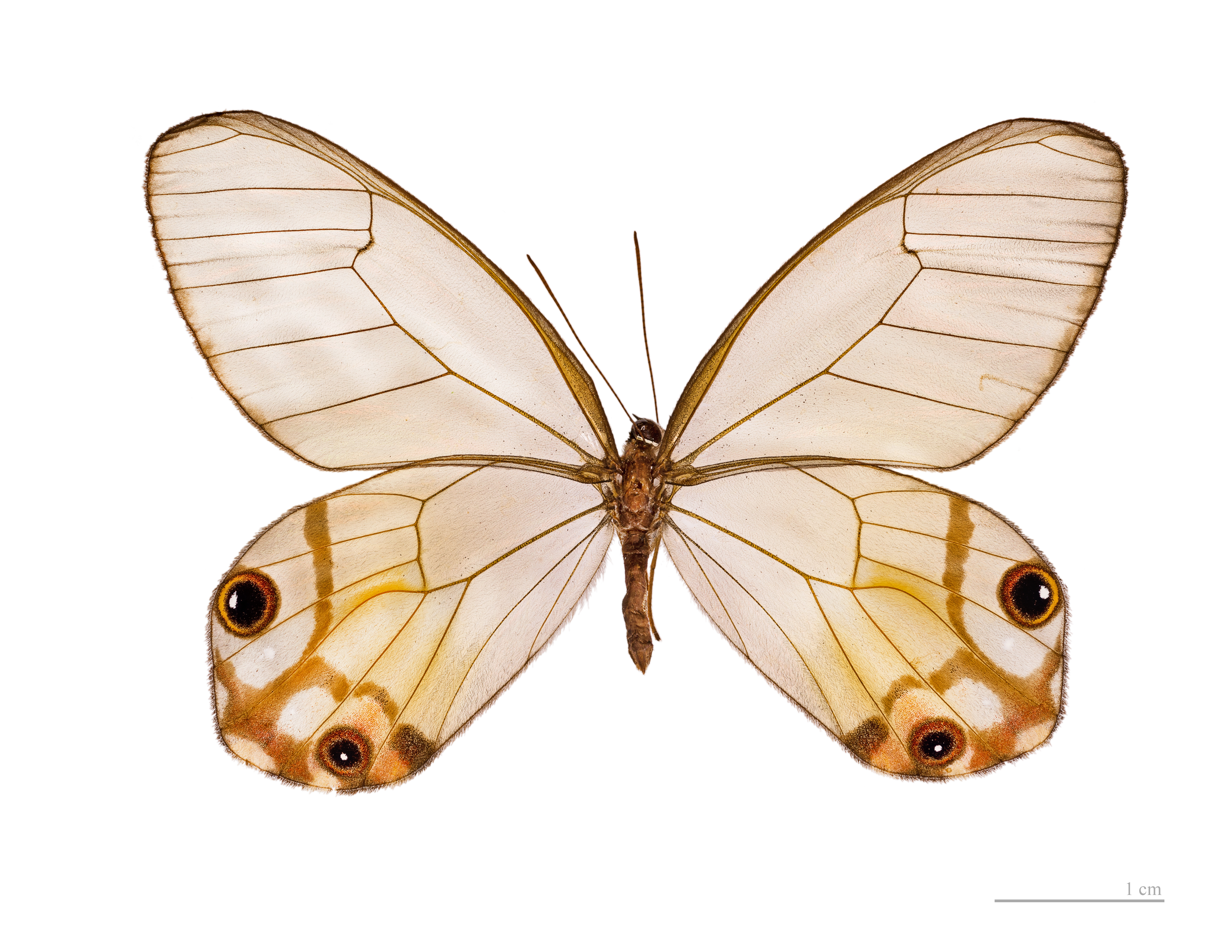
- Haetera piera

Scientific classification
- Domain: Eukaryota
- Kingdom: Animalia
- Phylum: Arthropoda
- Class: Insecta
- Order: Lepidoptera
- Family: Nymphalidae
- Tribe: Haeterini
- Genus: Haetera; Fabricius, 1807

Synonyms
- Oreas Hübner, [1807]; Maniola Rafinesque, 1815 (preocc. Schrank, 1891); Hetaera Hoffmannsegg, 1818; Pselna Billberg, 1820

= Haetera =

Genus of butterflies

Haetera is a Neotropical butterfly genus from the subfamily Satyrinae in the family Nymphalidae.

== Species ==
- Haetera macleannania (Bates, 1865)
- Haetera piera (Linnaeus, 1758)
