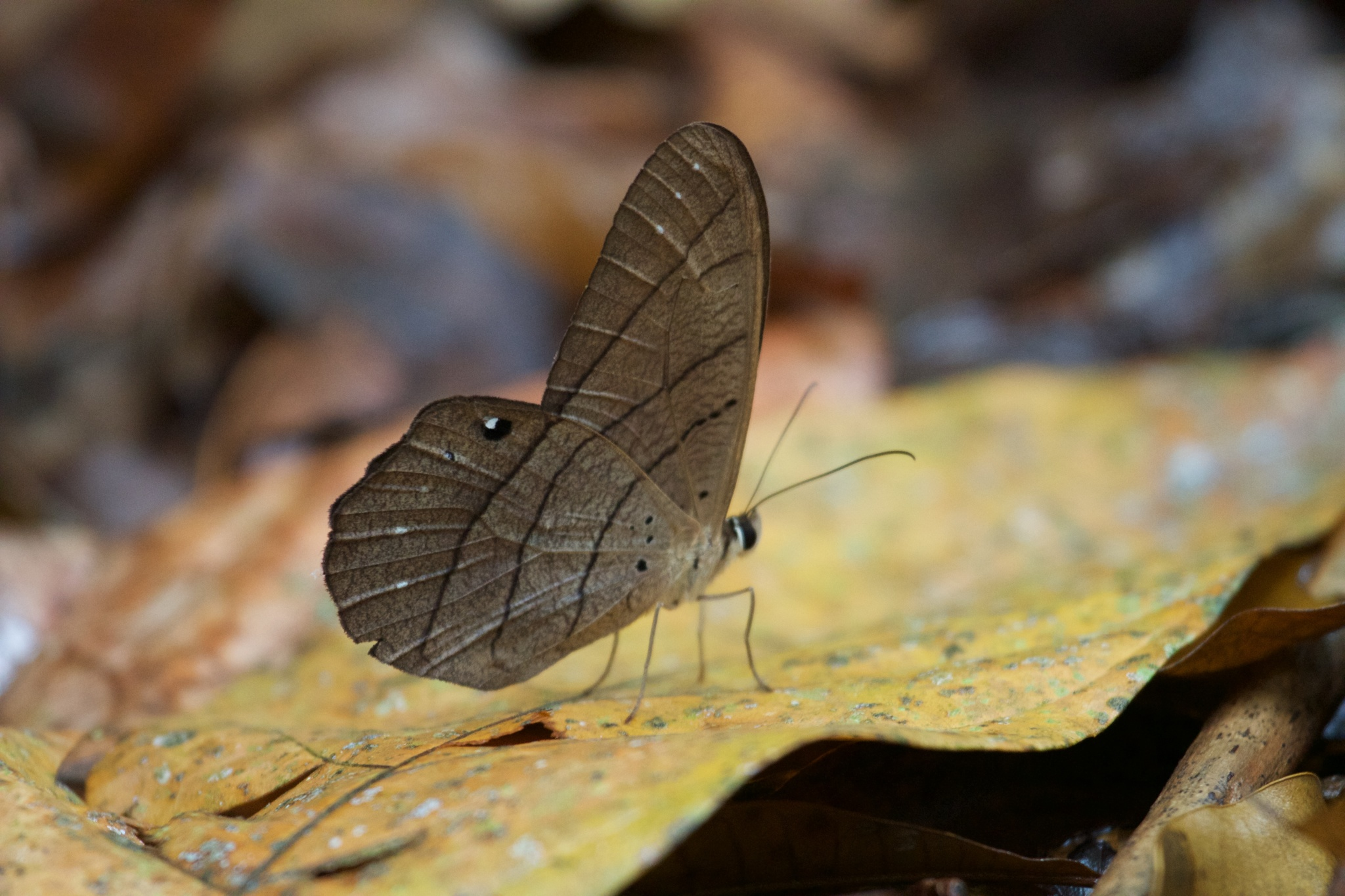

Scientific classification
- Domain: Eukaryota
- Kingdom: Animalia
- Phylum: Arthropoda
- Class: Insecta
- Order: Lepidoptera
- Family: Nymphalidae
- Genus: Pierella
- Species: P. luna

Binomial name
- Pierella luna Fabricius, 1793

= Pierella luna =

Species of butterfly

Pierella luna, the moon satyr, is a species of butterfly of the family Nymphalidae. It is found in Mexico, Costa Rica, Colombia, Panama, Nicaragua, Ecuador, Belize, Brazil, Guatemala and Honduras.

== Subspecies ==
- Pierella luna luna (nominate)
- Pierella luna lesbia Staudinger, 1887
- Pierella luna pallida (Salvin & Godman, 1868)
- Pierella luna rubecula Salvin & Godman, 1868
