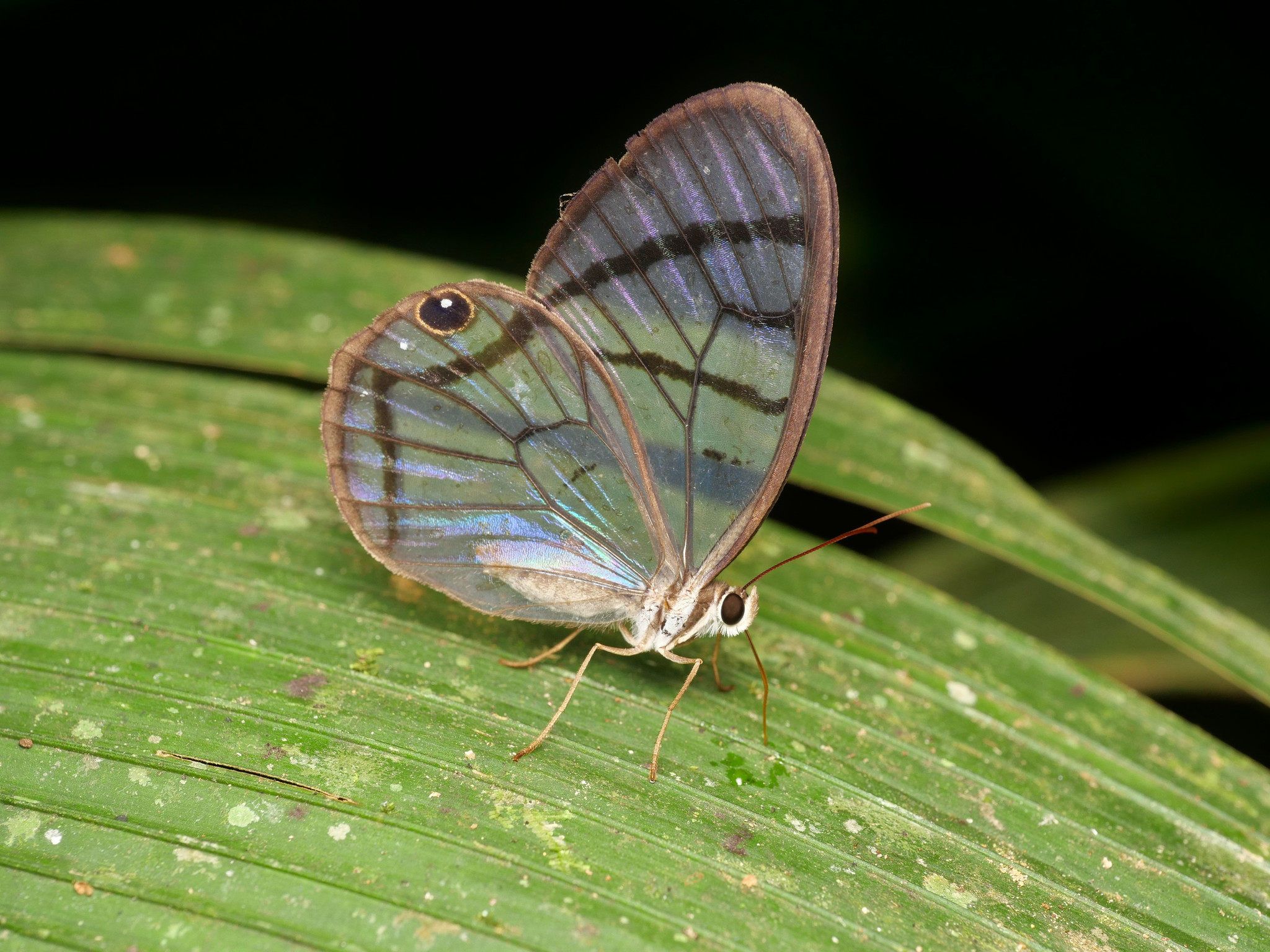
- Dulcedo polita

Scientific classification
- Kingdom: Animalia
- Phylum: Arthropoda
- Clade: Pancrustacea
- Class: Insecta
- Order: Lepidoptera
- Family: Nymphalidae
- Subfamily: Satyrinae
- Tribe: Haeterini
- Genus: Dulcedo d'Almeida, 1951
- Species: D. polita

Binomial name
- Dulcedo polita (Hewitson, 1869)

= Dulcedo =

Genus of butterflies

Dulcedo is a Neotropical butterfly genus from the subfamily Satyrinae in the family Nymphalidae. The genus is monotypic: its sole species is Dulcedo polita, which occurs from Nicaragua to Colombia.
