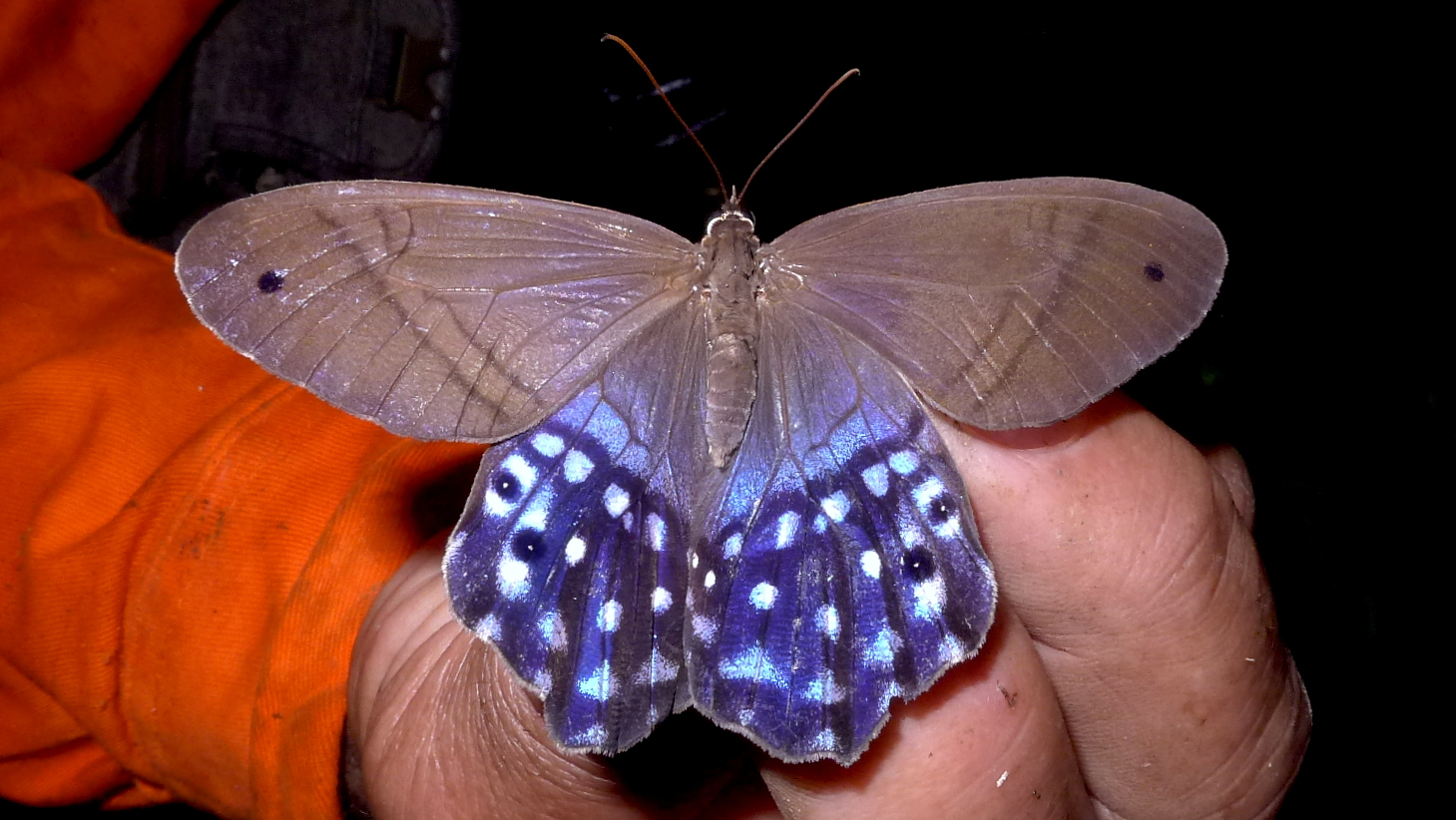

Scientific classification
- Kingdom: Animalia
- Phylum: Arthropoda
- Class: Insecta
- Order: Lepidoptera
- Family: Nymphalidae
- Genus: Pierella
- Species: P. lena

Binomial name
- Pierella lena (Linnaeus, 1767)

Synonyms
- Papilio lena Linnaeus, 1767; Papilio sectator Meerburgh, 1775; Haetera lena var. brasiliensis C. & R. Felder, 1862; Pierella lena glaucolena Weymer, 1910; Pierella lena f. melanosa Zikán & Wygodzinsky, 1948; Pierella lena f. obsoleta Brown, 1948; Pierella lena browni Forster, 1964

= Pierella lena =

Lena pierella

Species of butterfly

Pierella lena, the Lena pierella, is a species of butterfly of the family Nymphalidae. It is found in Suriname, the Guianas, Peru, Bolivia and Brazil.

== Subspecies ==
- Pierella lena lena
- Pierella lena brasiliensis C.Felder & R.Felder, 1862 (Peru, Bolivia, Brazil: Amazonas)
