= Geoff Gould =

English footballer

Personal information
- Full name: Geoffrey Gould
- Date of birth: 7 January 1945 (age 81)
- Place of birth: Blackburn, England
- Position: Left winger

Youth career
- 19??–1962: Bradford Park Avenue

Senior career*
Years	Team	Apps	(Gls)
1962–1969	Bradford Park Avenue	131	(18)
1968	→ Lincoln City (loan)	1	(0)
1969–1970	Notts County	1	(0)
1970–1971	South Melbourne		
- * Club domestic league appearances and goals

Geoffrey Gould (born 7 January 1945) is an English former professional footballer who made 133 appearances in the Football League playing on the left wing for Bradford Park Avenue, Lincoln City and Notts County. He also played in Australia for South Melbourne.
