= Piera Verri =

Italian basketball player (1913–2006)

Personal information
- Born: 23 September 1913 Sedico, Italy
- Died: 19 July 2006 (aged 92) Venice, Italy
- Position: Center

Career history
- 1932–1934: Reyer Venezia
- 1935–1936: Guf Venezia
- 1937: Guf Reyer
- 1938–1939: Audax Venezia
Medals
Women's basketball
Representing Italy
EuroBasket
Gold medal – first place	1938 Rome	Team

Piera Verri (23 September 1913 – 19 July 2006) was an Italian female basketball player. She played at the center position.

== International career ==
She represented Italian national basketball team at the EuroBasket 1938 in Rome where they won the gold medal, a first in the history of the Italian team.

== Personal life ==
She was married to Guido Manzini, player and coach of the men's and women's team of the BC Reyer Venezia.
