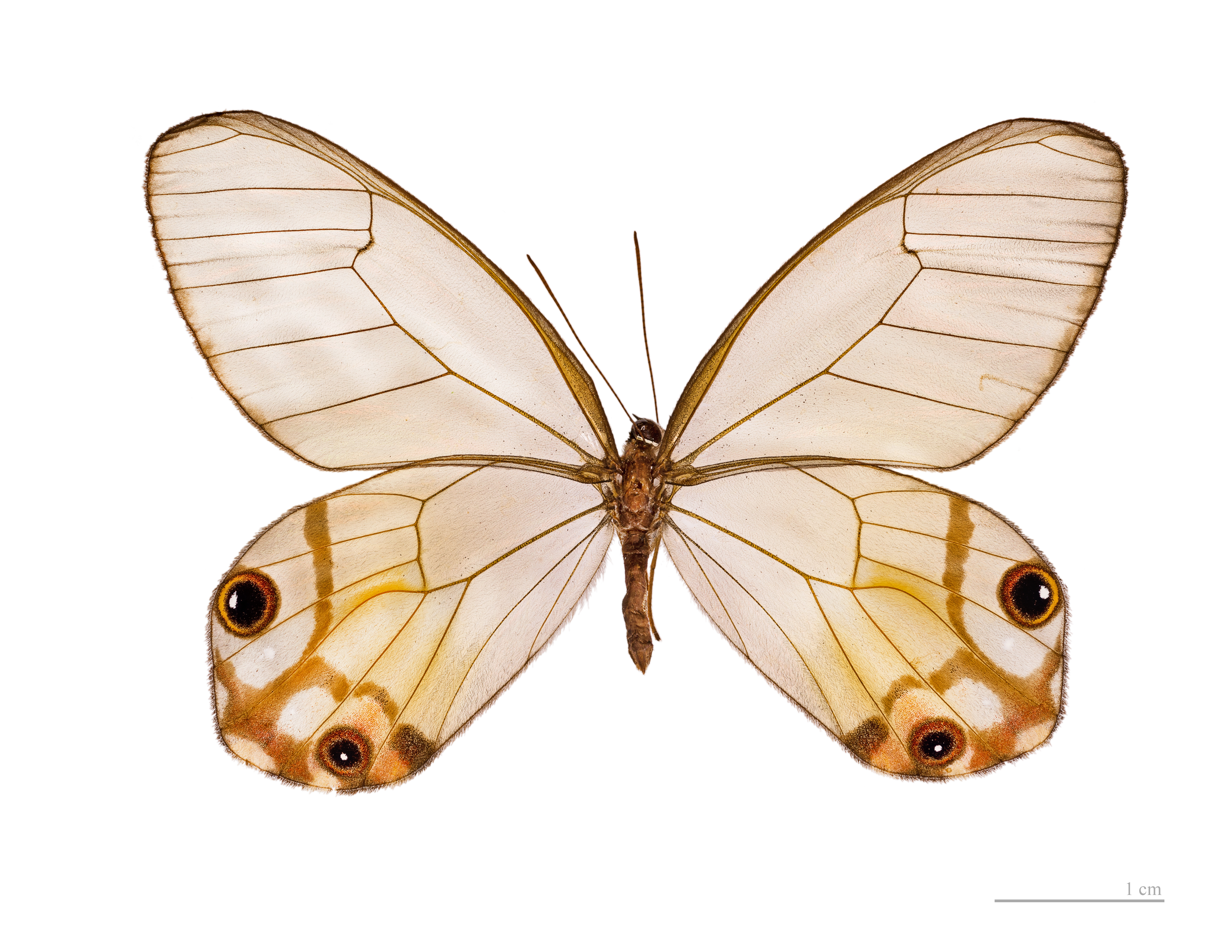

Scientific classification
- Kingdom: Animalia
- Phylum: Arthropoda
- Clade: Pancrustacea
- Class: Insecta
- Order: Lepidoptera
- Family: Nymphalidae
- Genus: Haetera
- Species: H. piera

Binomial name
- Haetera piera (Linnaeus, 1758)

Synonyms
- Papilio piera Linnaeus, 1758; Haetera hymenaea C. & R. Felder, 1867; Haetera piera var. negra C. & R. Felder, 1862; Haetera piera f. ecuadora Brown, [1943]; Haetera piera f. ecuadora f. pseudopiera Brown, [1943]; Haetera pirea[sic] f. mariuá Zikán & Wygodzinsky, 1948; Haetera piera lesbia Bryk, 1953; Haetera piera lesbia f. metathetica Bryk, 1953

= Haetera piera =

Species of butterfly

Haetera piera, the amber phantom, is a butterfly species from the subfamily Satyrinae in the family Nymphalidae. This species can be found in the Guianas, Brazil, Ecuador, Peru, Bolivia and Venezuela.

== Subspecies ==
- Haetera piera piera
- Haetera piera diaphana Lucas, 1857 (Brazil: Bahia)
- Haetera piera negra C. & R. Felder, 1862 (Peru, Ecuador, Brazil: Amazonas)
- Haetera piera unocellata Weymer, 1910 (Bolivia)
- Haetera piera pakitza Lamas, 1998 (Peru)
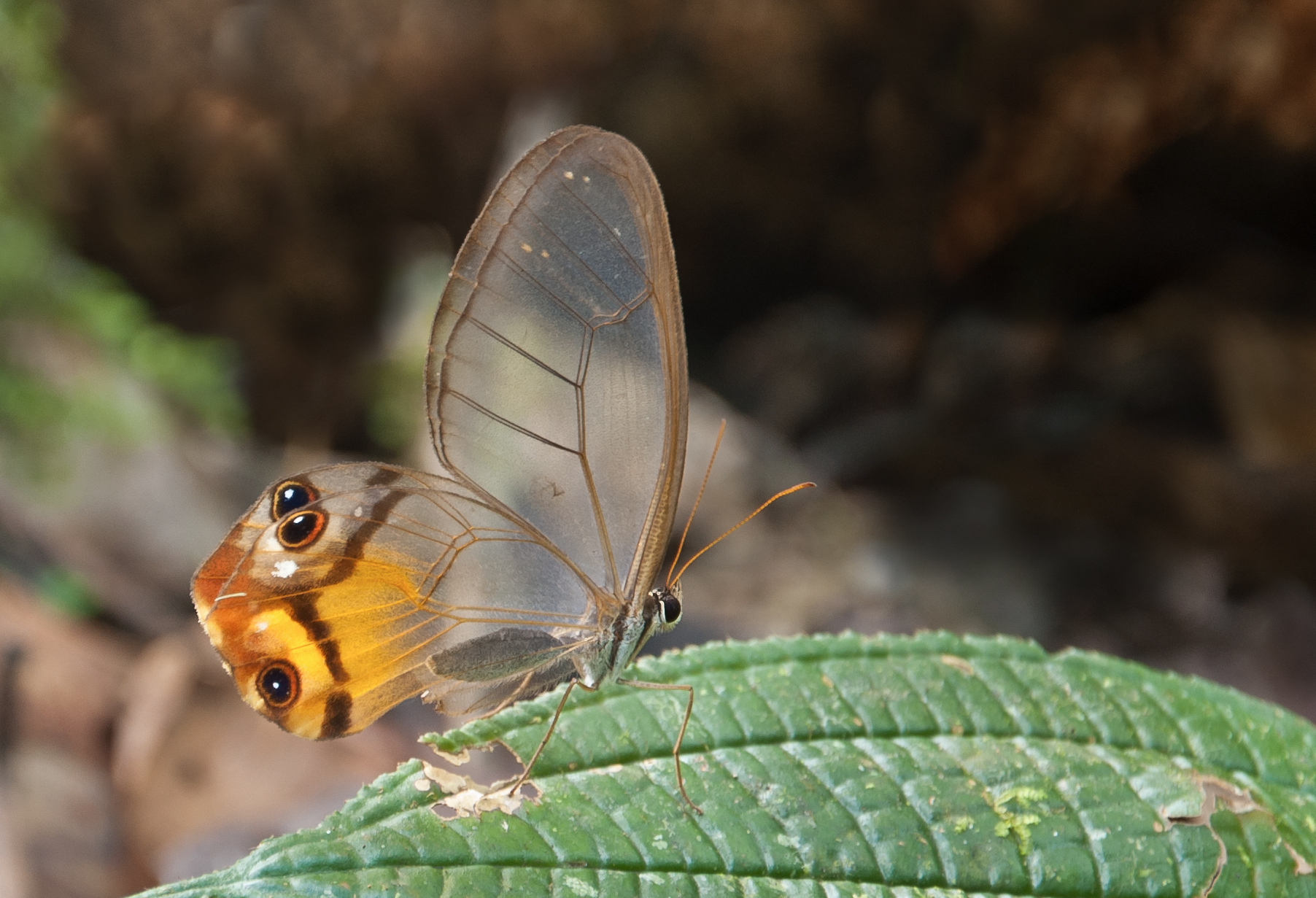
H. p. piera
at the base of Ptarí-tepui, Canaima National Park, Venezuela

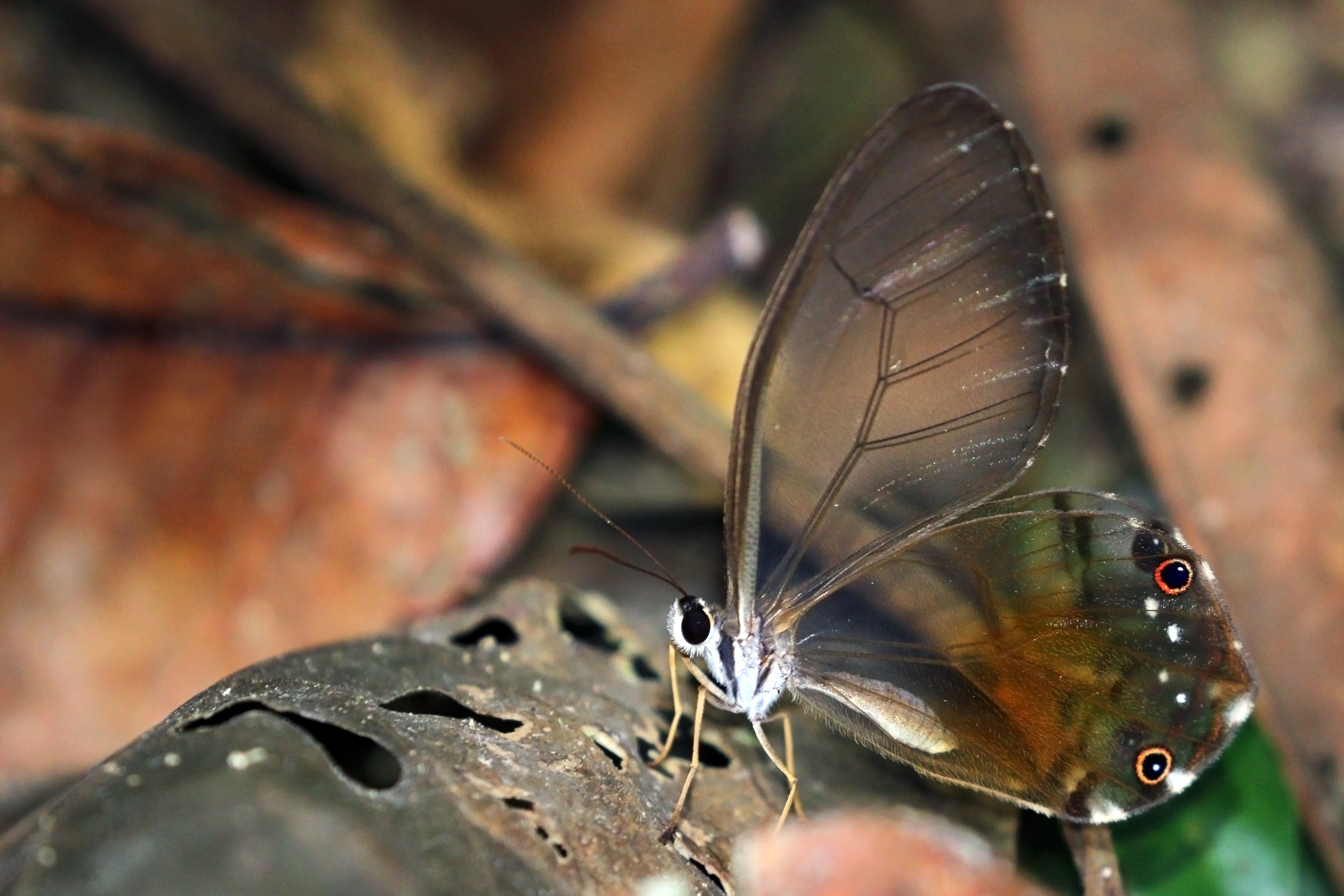
H. p. negra
near Cristalino River, Southern Amazon, Brazil
