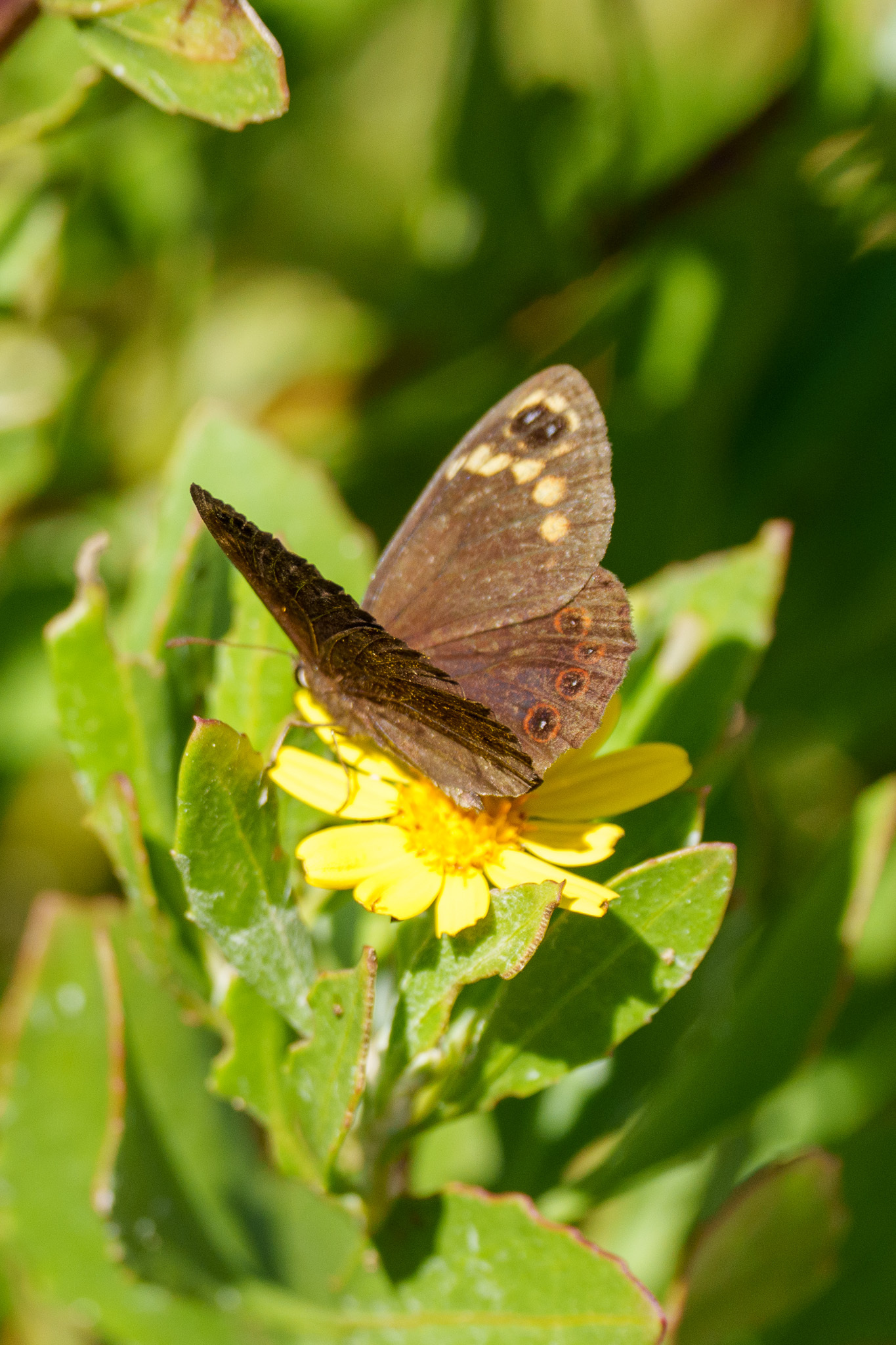
- Dira clytus

Scientific classification
- Kingdom: Animalia
- Phylum: Arthropoda
- Clade: Pancrustacea
- Class: Insecta
- Order: Lepidoptera
- Family: Nymphalidae
- Subfamily: Satyrinae
- Tribe: Dirini; Verity, 1953

Genera
- See text

= Dirini =

Tribe of butterflies

Dirini is one of the tribes in the butterfly subfamily Satyrinae of the family Nymphalidae. Consisting of 29 species (Note: Price et al. recognizes 28 species in 7 genera, while Williams' Afrotropical Butterflies and Skippers (2016) and Wahlberg (2018) elevated Torynesis mintha hawequas to full species status as Torynesis hawequas.) in 6 genera, (Note: Genomic analysis by Zhang et al. conducted in 2023 revealed that Serradinga was better suited as a subspecies of Dingana.) the group's members are exclusively found in southern Africa. Initially distinguished by having a forewing cell length shorter than half the length of the forewing, the morphological synapomorphy that links the members of the Dirini together is the presence of the scaphium on the male genitalia. The group is remarkable for its restricted distribution within South Africa and Lesotho, with a single species whose distribution extends into Zimbabwe. It is closely affiliated with the tribe Melanitini, of whom the Neotropical Manataria hercyna is closest related to the Dirini as a whole.

== Description ==
Members of the tribe are endemic to southern Africa, with the group consisting of 29 species in 6 genera. The larvae of the members feed on grasses. First characterized by Miller in 1968 as exhibiting a forewing cell length shorter than half of the length of the forewing, this feature united the genera of Dira, Dingana, Serradinga, Torynesis and Tarsocera. This circumscription excluded Aeropetes or Paralethe, which were alternatively placed into Lethini by Miller in 1968, Elymniini by Ackery et al. in 1995, and Melanitini by Peña et al. in 2005. Phylogenetic analysis in 2010 by Price et al. confirmed their continued placement within the Dirini. The presence of a scaphium on the male genitalia was identified as the sole morphological synapomorphy which united the group.

== Systematics and taxonomy ==
Per Peña & Wahlberg, 2008, the tribe is around 25 million years old. The divergence of Dirini and Melanitini occurred between 23 and 47 million years ago (Ma). The initial point of radiation for the tribe was just before or at the Oligocene-Miocene transition around 29-24 Ma. The seven genera of the tribe were described as "convincingly monophyletic" by Price et al., reflected in the morphological and biological homogeneity of the genera that contain more than a single species, with the relative diversity in the morphological and biological sense between the various genera.

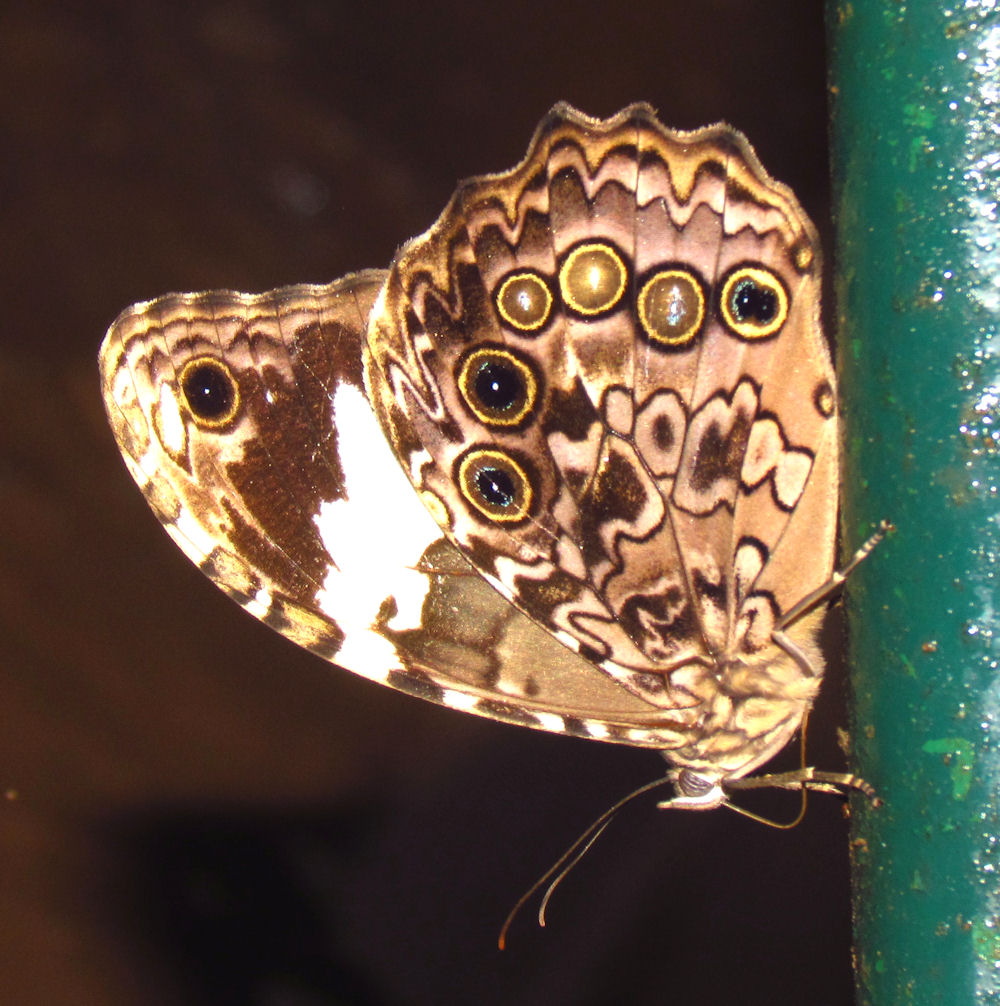
Manataria hercyna is supported by several studies to be sister to the Dirini.

The most stable group within the Satyrinae is the sister group relationship between Dirini and Melanitini, having been recovered in studies by Peña et al. 2006, Peña and Wahlberg 2008, Wahlberg et al. 2009, and Price et al. 2010. Manataria hercyna was confirmed to be a sister taxon of the tribe, with that relationship supported by previous analyses Peña et al. in 2006, and Peña & Wahlberg in 2008. Studies showed that Manataria would be placed into the Melanitini, but its placement would render Melanitini paraphyletic, which suggests that it would be best to either place Manataria into its own tribe or within the Dirini. The relationship between Manataria and the remainder of the Dirini was described by Price et al. as "odd", due to the former's Neotropical distribution compared to the tribe's Afrotropical distribution, and its estimated divergence from the remainder of the tribe 40 Ma from the present. This would mean that divergence had occurred when South America was several thousand kilometers from the African coast, which is a process that has occurred similarly for the amphisbaenid lizards, platyrrhine monkeys and caviomorph rodents, suggesting an underlying process in a westward direction.

The following phylogenetic trees are adapted from Wahlberg and Brower, 2011:

- - Elymniini
  - - - Zetherini
      - Amathusiini
    - - - - Brassolini
          - Morphini
        - - - Melanitini
            - Dirini
          - Haeterini
      - Satyrini

- Dirini
  - - - - Dingana
        - Serradinga
      - Dira
    - - Torynesis
      - - Tarsocera
        - Aeropetes
  - Paralethe

== Distribution ==
Members of the tribe are noted for their remarkable degree of endemism, being found almost exclusively in South Africa and Lesotho, with a single member whose distribution extends into eastern Zimbabwe. (Note: Price et al. does not specify which member of the Dirini has the distribution that extends into eastern Zimbabwe, but per Van Son in 1955 and Williams in 2019, Aeropetes tulbaghia has a distribution that extends into eastern Zimbabwe.) They are almost all found on high-lying ground, but are described by Price et al. as not a truly montane group, occurring on slopes from the south and east and from elevations at 2,000 metres (6,600 ft) in the north and west. Members of the tribe are found in South Africa's Succulent Karoo region and grasslands, which are dominated by C3 producing grasses, with the exception of Paralethe dendrophilus, which inhabits coastal and Afromontane forests.

== Genera ==
Genus, species, and subspecies list derived from Price et al. 2010, and Williams 2018. Price et al. recognizes Torynesis hawequas as a subspecies of Torynesis mintha (as Torynesis mintha hawequas), while Williams recognizes it at full species status. Genomic testing conducted in 2023 by Zhang et al. revealed that Serradinga was better suited as a subgenus of Dingana.

Photograph	Scientific name	Species
	Aeropetes Billberg, 1820	Aeropetes tulbaghia (Linnaeus, 1764)
	Dingana van Son, 1955	Dingana alaedeus Henning & Henning, 1996; Dingana alticola Henning & Henning, 1996; Dingana angusta Henning & Henning, 1996; Dingana (Serradinga) bowkeri (Trimen, 1870); Dingana bowkeri bella (van Son, 1955); Dingana bowkeri bowkeri (Trimen, 1870); Dingana clara (van Son, 1940); Dingana (Serradinga) clarki (van Son, 1955); Dingana clarki amissivallis Henning & Henning, 1996; Dingana clarki clarki (van Son, 1955); Dingana clarki dracomontana Henning & Henning, 1996; Dingana clarki ocra Henning & Henning, 1996; Dingana dingana (Trimen, 1873); Dingana fraterna Henning & Henning, 1996; Dingana jerinae Henning & Henning, 1996; Dingana (Serradinga) kammanassiensis (Henning & Henning, 1994)
	Dira Hübner, 1819	Dira clytus (Linnaeus, 1764); Dira clytus clytus (Linnaeus, 1764); Dira clytus eurina Quickelberge, 1978; Dira jansei (Swierstra, 1909); Dira oxylus (Trimen, 1881); Dira swanepoeli (van Son, 1939); Dira swanepoeli isolata van Son, 1955; Dira swanepoeli swanepoeli (van Son, 1939)
	Paralethe van Son, 1955	Paralethe dendrophilus (Trimen, 1862); Paralethe dendrophilus albina van Son, 1955; Paralethe dendrophilus dendrophilus (Trimen, 1862); Paralethe dendrophilus indosa (Trimen, 1879); Paralethe dendrophilus junodi (van Son, 1935)
	Tarsocera Butler, 1899	Tarsocera cassina (Butler, 1868); Tarsocera cassus (Linnaeus, 1764); Tarsocera cassus cassus (Linnaeus, 1764); Tarsocera cassus outeniqua Vári, 1971; Tarsocera dicksoni (van Son, 1962); Tarsocera fulvina Vári, 1971; Tarsocera imitator Vári, 1971; Tarsocera namaquensis Vári, 1971; Tarsocera southeyae Dickson, 1969
	Torynesis Butler, 1899	Torynesis hawequas Dickson, 1973; Torynesis magna (van Son, 1941); Torynesis mintha (Geyer, [1837]); Torynesis mintha mintha (Geyer, 1837); Torynesis mintha piquetbergensis Dickson, 1967; Torynesis orangica Vári, 1971; Torynesis pringlei Dickson, 1979
