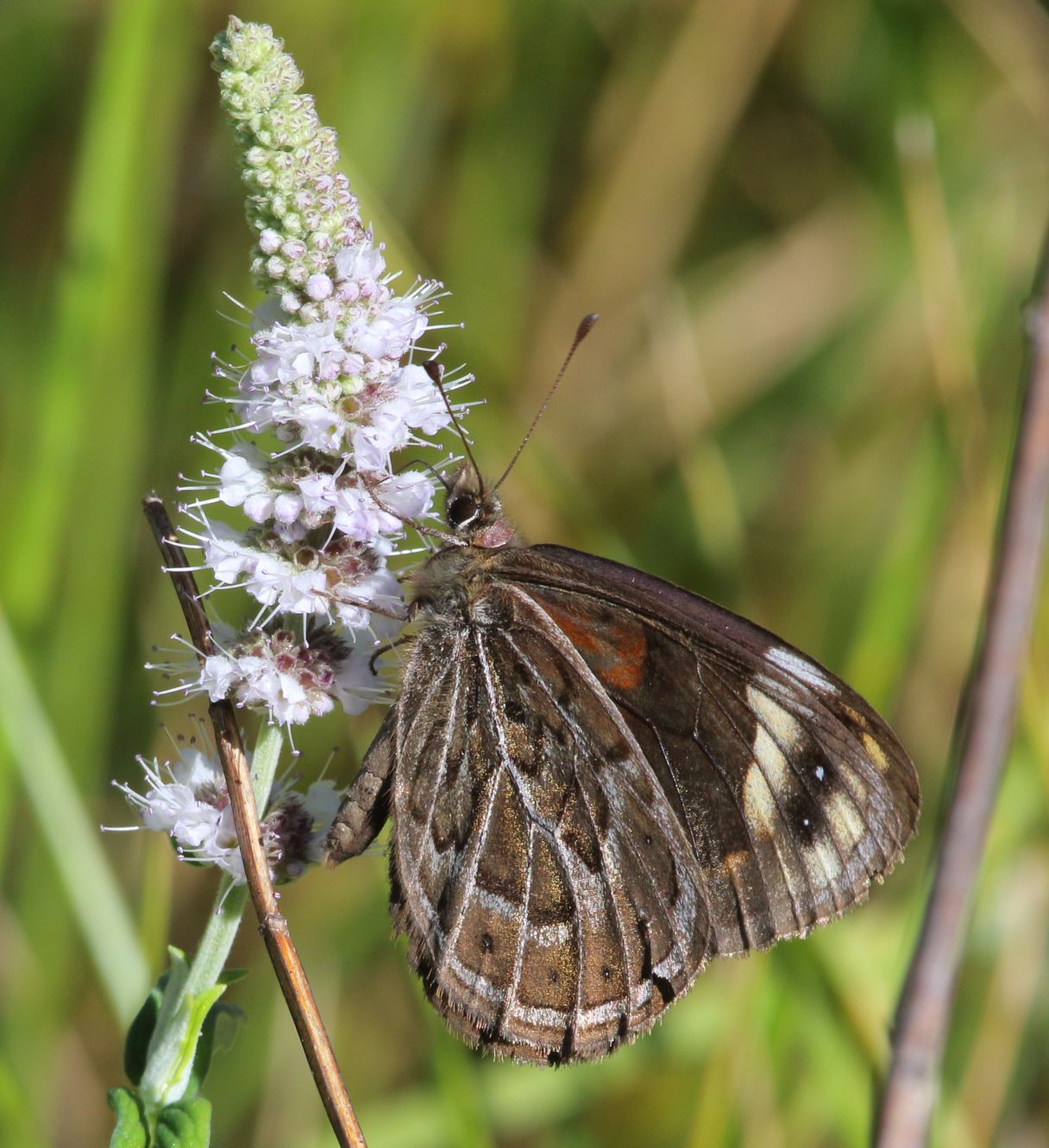
- Torynesis magna

Scientific classification
- Kingdom: Animalia
- Phylum: Arthropoda
- Class: Insecta
- Order: Lepidoptera
- Family: Nymphalidae
- Tribe: Dirini
- Genus: Torynesis; Butler, 1899

Diversity
- Five species

Synonyms
- Mintha van Son, 1955

= Torynesis =

Genus of butterflies

Torynesis is a genus of butterflies from the subfamily Satyrinae in the family Nymphalidae. It comprises five species from South Africa and Lesotho. It is one of the genera in the tribe Dirini Verity, 1953; other genera of this tribe that are found in the Afrotropical Region are Paralethe, Aeropetes, Tarsocera, Dira, Serradinga and Dingana.

== Species ==
- Torynesis hawequas Dickson, 1973
- Torynesis magna (van Son, 1941)
- Torynesis mintha (Geyer, [1837])
- Torynesis orangica Vári, 1971
- Torynesis pringlei Dickson, 1979
