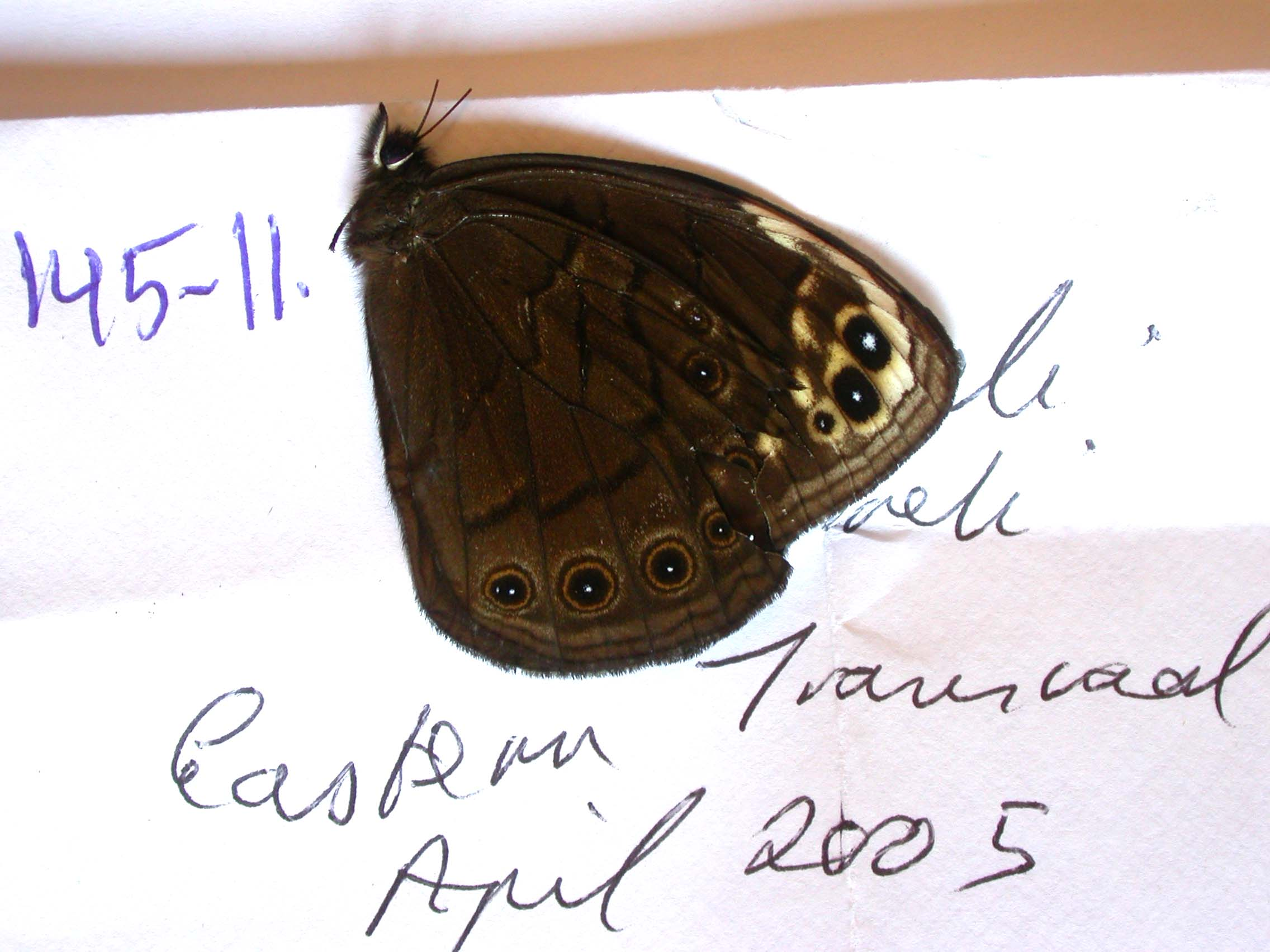
- Dira swanepoli

Scientific classification
- Kingdom: Animalia
- Phylum: Arthropoda
- Class: Insecta
- Order: Lepidoptera
- Family: Nymphalidae
- Genus: Dira
- Species: D. swanepoeli

Binomial name
- Dira swanepoeli (van Son, 1939)

Synonyms
- Leptoneura swanepoeli van Son, 1939

= Dira swanepoeli =

Swanepoel's widow

Species of butterfly

Dira swanepoeli, or Swanepoel's widow, is a butterfly of the family Nymphalidae. It is found in the southern slopes of the Blouberg Range in Limpopo, South Africa.

== Description ==
The wingspan is 58–65 mm for males and 60–68 mm for females. Adults are on wing from late February to early March. There is one generation per year.

== Habitat and behavior ==
Adults are observed residing in rocky grasslands with stunted forest clearings, specifically in areas with long grass like Merxmullera.

The larvae feed on various Poaceae species, including Eragrostis aspera, Ehrharta erecta and Pennisetum clandestinum.

== Subspecies ==
- Dira swanepoeli swanepoeli (northern Transvaal)
- Dira swanepoeli isolata van Son, 1955 (Blouberg Range in northern Transvaal)
