= Dingana bowkeri =

Bowker's widow

Scientific classification
- Kingdom: Animalia
- Phylum: Arthropoda
- Clade: Pancrustacea
- Class: Insecta
- Order: Lepidoptera
- Family: Nymphalidae
- Genus: Dingana
- Species: D. bowkeri

Binomial name
- Dingana bowkeri (Trimen, 1870)

Synonyms
- Leptoneura bowkeri Trimen, 1870; Serradinga bowkeri (Trimen, 1870)

Species of butterfly

Dingana bowkeri, or Bowker's widow, is a butterfly of the family Nymphalidae. It is found in Lesotho, South Africa, in the Eastern Cape and Richmond and Cradock in the Cape Province.

The wingspan is 50–55 mm for males and 48–54 mm for females. Adults are on wing from November to February (with a peak from December to January). There is one generation per year.

The larvae probably feed on various Poaceae species, probably including Merxmuellera species. Larvae have been reared on Pennisetum clandestinum.

== Subspecies ==
- Dingana bowkeri bowkeri (north-eastern Cape, Natal, Lesotho, Transvaal, Orange Free State)
- Dingana bowkeri bella van Son, 1955 (central Cape: Richmond)
