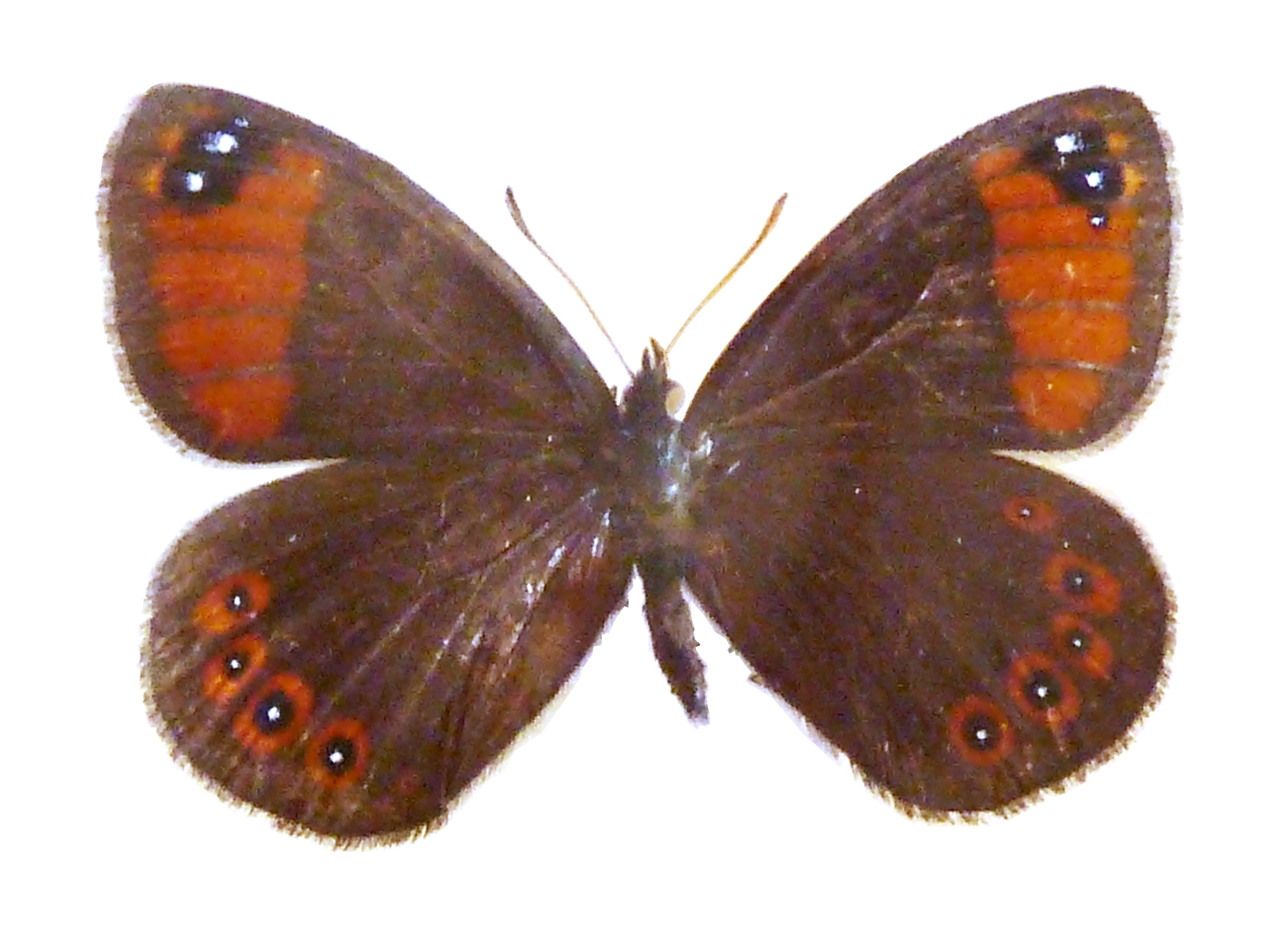

Scientific classification
- Domain: Eukaryota
- Kingdom: Animalia
- Phylum: Arthropoda
- Class: Insecta
- Order: Lepidoptera
- Family: Nymphalidae
- Genus: Dingana
- Species: D. alaedeus

Binomial name
- Dingana alaedeus Henning & Henning, 1984
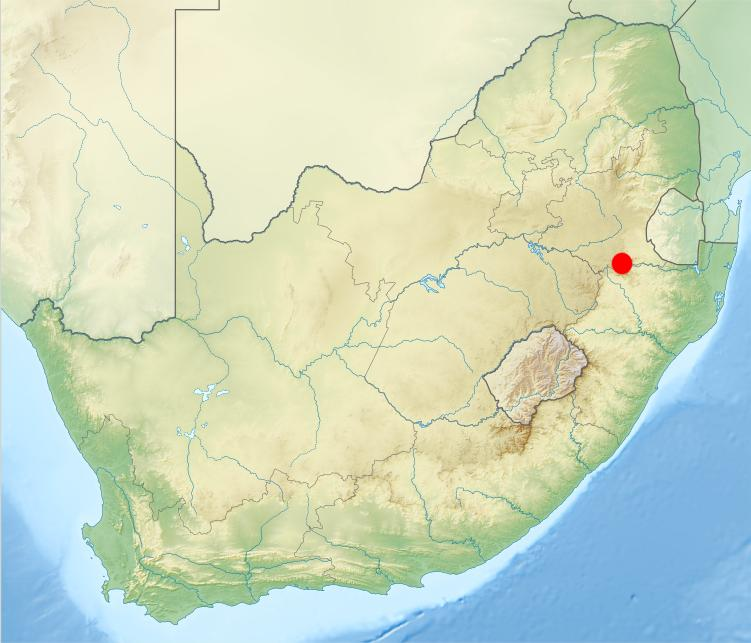
- Range shown in red

= Dingana alaedeus =

Species of butterfly

Dingana alaedeus, the Wakkerstroom widow, is a butterfly of the family Nymphalidae. It is only known from high altitude grassland at about 2,000 meters. It has a short flying period in summer. The specific name means “god of the wing” in Latin.

== Range and habitat ==
It ranges from the southern part of the Mpumalanga province to adjacent KwaZulu-Natal, South Africa. The species is found approximately at the center of the range of D. dingana, with no apparent geographical barriers to isolate the two. The habitat is steep grassy slopes and bushy ridges.

== Description ==
The wingspan is 51–55 mm for males and 50–54 mm for females. Compared to nominate D. dingana it is smaller with a more swarthy background colour, while a large orange-red patch covers the postdiscal area. The flight resembles that of other Dingana species.

The discal line on the hindwing's underside angles acutely inward at vein M3, as opposed to D. dingana where the discal line is curved throughout. The upperside of the front wing has at least two ocellate spots that are fused together. The clubs of the antennae are more rounded than in either D. dingana or D. bowkeri, and the tibiae and tarsi of the front legs are also proportionally larger than in the aforementioned species. The genitalia are comparable to that of D. dingana.

== Biology ==
Adults are on wing from mid-October to December (with a peak in November or December). There is one generation per year. The larvae probably feed on various Poaceae species, and have been reared on Pennisetum clandestinum.
