= Dingana clarki =

Clark's widow

Scientific classification
- Domain: Eukaryota
- Kingdom: Animalia
- Phylum: Arthropoda
- Class: Insecta
- Order: Lepidoptera
- Family: Nymphalidae
- Genus: Dingana
- Species: D. clarki

Binomial name
- Dingana clarki van Son, 1955

Synonyms
- Serradinga clarki (van Son, 1955)

Species of butterfly

Dingana clarki, or Clark's widow, is a butterfly of the family Nymphalidae. It is found in South Africa.

The wingspan is 45–54 mm for males and 44–52 mm for females. Adults are on wing from November to February (with a peak from December to January, later for the northern populations). There is one generation per year.

The larvae probably feed on various Poaceae species. Larvae have been reared on Pennisetum clandestinum.

== Subspecies ==
- Dingana clarki clarki (Eastern Cape)
- Dingana clarki amissivallis (Henning & Henning, 1996) (Verloren Valei in Mpumalanga)
- Dingana clarki dracomontana (Henning & Henning, 1996) (lower Drakensberg, from Eastern Cape to KwaZulu-Natal, Eswatini and Mpumalanga)
- Dingana clarki ocra (Henning & Henning, 1996) (Mpumalanga Drakensberg)
