= Torynesis pringlei =

Pringle's widow

Scientific classification
- Domain: Eukaryota
- Kingdom: Animalia
- Phylum: Arthropoda
- Class: Insecta
- Order: Lepidoptera
- Family: Nymphalidae
- Genus: Torynesis
- Species: T. pringlei

Binomial name
- Torynesis pringlei Dickson, 1979

Species of butterfly

Torynesis pringlei, or Pringle's widow, is a butterfly of the family Nymphalidae. It is found in Lesotho (only known from the mountains near Mokhotlong and Rafolatsane and above the Sehonghong river). There is also one record from the southern Drakensberg near Bushman's Nek in KwaZulu-Natal.

The wingspan is 42–52 mm for males and 45–55 mm for females. Adults are on wing in late January. There is one generation per year.

The larvae most likely feed on various Poaceae species, including Merxmuellera species.
