= Torynesis mintha =

Mintha widow

Scientific classification
- Domain: Eukaryota
- Kingdom: Animalia
- Phylum: Arthropoda
- Class: Insecta
- Order: Lepidoptera
- Family: Nymphalidae
- Genus: Torynesis
- Species: T. mintha

Binomial name
- Torynesis mintha (Geyer, [1837])

Synonyms
- Dira mintha Geyer, [1837]

Species of butterfly

Torynesis mintha, the mintha widow, is a butterfly of the family Nymphalidae. It is found in South Africa.

The wingspan is 40–45 mm for males and 45–48 mm for females. Adults of subspecies mintha are on wing from March to April and of piquetbergensis from April to May. There is one generation per year.

The larvae feed on various Poaceae species, including Merxmuellera and Danthonia species.

== Subspecies ==
- Torynesis mintha mintha (south-western Cape)
- Torynesis mintha piquetbergensis Dickson, 1967 (Piquetberg Mountains)
