= Torynesis hawequas =

Hawequas widow

Scientific classification
- Domain: Eukaryota
- Kingdom: Animalia
- Phylum: Arthropoda
- Class: Insecta
- Order: Lepidoptera
- Family: Nymphalidae
- Genus: Torynesis
- Species: T. hawequas

Binomial name
- Torynesis hawequas Dickson, 1973

Species of butterfly

Torynesis hawequas, the Hawequas widow, is a butterfly of the family Nymphalidae. It is found in the Western Cape and above Nuwekloof and north from Gydoberg to the Cederberg in South Africa.

The wingspan is 44–50 mm for males and 47–54 mm for females. Adults are on wing from March to April. There is one generation per year.

The larvae feed on various Poaceae species, including Merxmuellera species.
