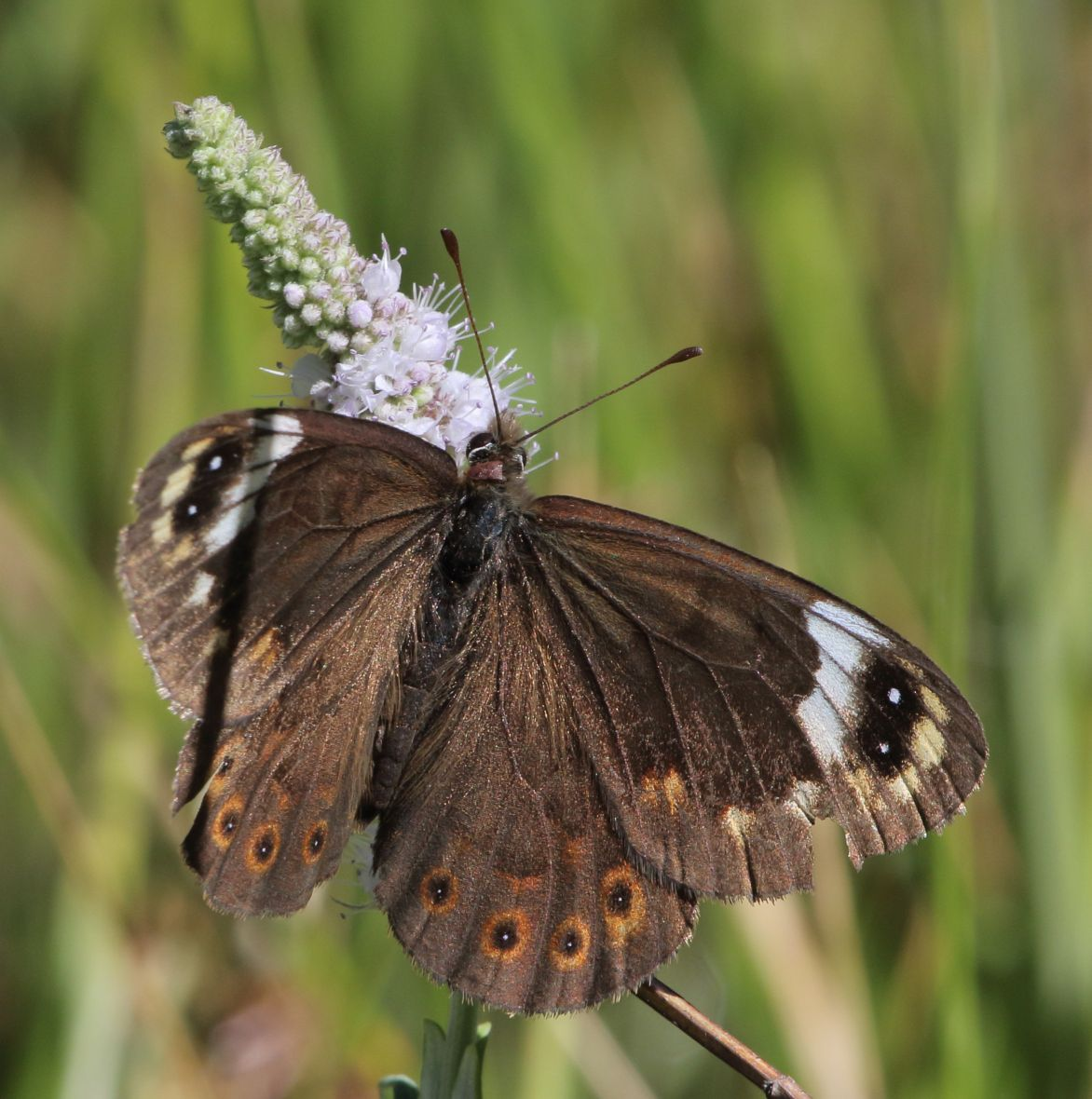

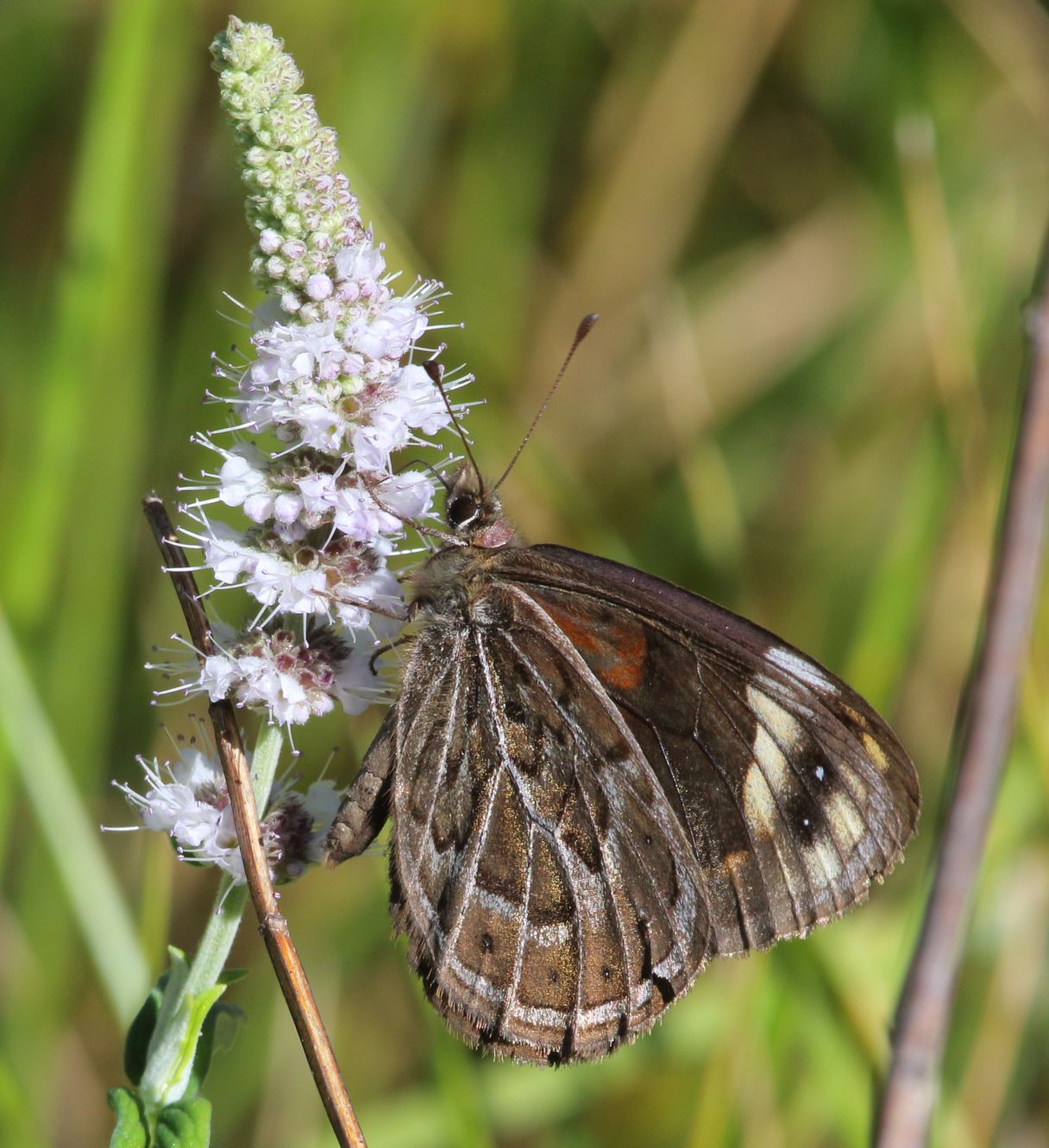

Scientific classification
- Domain: Eukaryota
- Kingdom: Animalia
- Phylum: Arthropoda
- Class: Insecta
- Order: Lepidoptera
- Family: Nymphalidae
- Genus: Torynesis
- Species: T. magna

Binomial name
- Torynesis magna (van Son, 1941)

Synonyms
- Leptoneura mintha magna van Son, 1941; Torynesis magna ab. tripupillata Vári, 1971

= Torynesis magna =

Large widow

Species of butterfly

Torynesis magna, the large widow, is a butterfly of the family Nymphalidae. It is found in South Africa in the Eastern Cape from Lootsberg to Burgersdorp as far north as Barkly East and as far south as Uniondale.

The wingspan is 46–54 mm for males and 50–60 mm for females. Adults are on wing from February to March. There is one generation per year

The larvae feed on various Poaceae species, including Merxmuellera and Danthonia species.
