= Dingana jerinae =

Jerine's widow

Scientific classification
- Domain: Eukaryota
- Kingdom: Animalia
- Phylum: Arthropoda
- Class: Insecta
- Order: Lepidoptera
- Family: Nymphalidae
- Genus: Dingana
- Species: D. jerinae

Binomial name
- Dingana jerinae Henning & Henning, 1996

Species of butterfly

Dingana jerinae, or Jerine's widow, is a butterfly of the family Nymphalidae. It is only known from the upper southern scree slopes of the Kransberg in Limpopo, South Africa.

The wingspan is 65–72 mm. Adults are on wing in November, with a single generation per year.

The larvae probably feed on various Poaceae species. Larvae have been reared on Pennisetum clandestinum.
