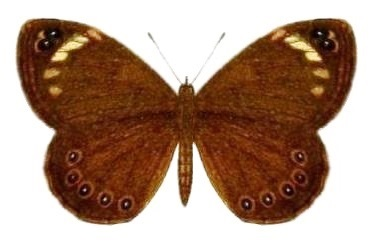
- D. clytus depicted in Seitz's Fauna Africana

Scientific classification
- Kingdom: Animalia
- Phylum: Arthropoda
- Class: Insecta
- Order: Lepidoptera
- Family: Nymphalidae
- Genus: Dira
- Species: D. clytus

Binomial name
- Dira clytus (Linnaeus, 1764)
- Range of D. clytus in southernmost South Africa

Synonyms
- Papilio clytus Linnaeus, 1764; Leptoneura clytus (Linnaeus, 1764); Papilio tisiphone von Rottemburg, 1775

= Dira clytus =

Cape autumn widow

Species of butterfly

Dira clytus, the Cape autumn widow, is a butterfly of the family Nymphalidae. It is found in South Africa.

The wingspan is 45–55 mm. Adults of ssp. clytus are on wing from late February to April and of ssp. eurina from late February to late March. There is one generation per year.

The larvae feed on various Poaceae species, including Ehrharta erecta, Pennisetum clandestinum, Stipa dregeana, Panicum deustrum, Stenotaphrum glabrum and Stenotaphrum secundatum.

== Subspecies ==
- Dira clytus clytus — south-western Cape
- Dira clytus eurina Quickelberge, 1978 — southern Cape
