= Dira jansei =

Janse's widow

Scientific classification
- Domain: Eukaryota
- Kingdom: Animalia
- Phylum: Arthropoda
- Class: Insecta
- Order: Lepidoptera
- Family: Nymphalidae
- Genus: Dira
- Species: D. jansei

Binomial name
- Dira jansei (Swierstra, 1911)

Synonyms
- Leptoneura jansei Swierstra, 1911

Species of butterfly

Dira jansei, or Janse's widow, is a butterfly of the family Nymphalidae. It is found on wooded hillsides in the savanna/grassland ecotone in Limpopo's Strydpoortberg and Drakensberg and from the Makapans Cave to Mariepskop.

== Description ==
The wingspan is 48–55 mm for males and 52–58 mm for females. Adults are on wing from late February to mid-March. There is one generation per year.

== Habitat and behavior ==
It is observed residing near steep-grass covered slopes, with loose rocks, a terrain which is hazardous.

The larvae feed on various Poaceae species, including Ehrharta erecta and Pennisetum clandestinum.
