= Dingana clara =

Wolkberg widow

Conservation status
- Endangered (IUCN 3.1)

Scientific classification
- Domain: Eukaryota
- Kingdom: Animalia
- Phylum: Arthropoda
- Class: Insecta
- Order: Lepidoptera
- Family: Nymphalidae
- Genus: Dingana
- Species: D. clara

Binomial name
- Dingana clara (van Son, 1940)

Synonyms
- Dingana dingana clara

Species of butterfly

Dingana clara, the Wolkberg widow, is a butterfly of the family Nymphalidae. It is only known from the Wolkberg in the Limpopo Province.

The wingspan is 60–65 mm for males and 56–62 mm for females. Adults are on wing from September to November (with a peak in October). There is one generation per year

The larvae probably feed on various Poaceae species, including Pennisetum clandestinum.
