= Dingana kammanassiensis =

Scientific classification
- Domain: Eukaryota
- Kingdom: Animalia
- Phylum: Arthropoda
- Class: Insecta
- Order: Lepidoptera
- Family: Nymphalidae
- Genus: Dingana
- Species: D. kammanassiensis

Binomial name
- Dingana kammanassiensis Henning & Henning, 1994

Synonyms
- Serradinga kammanassiensis (Henning & Henning, 1994)

Species of butterfly

Dingana kammanassiensis, the Kammanassie widow, is a butterfly of the family Nymphalidae. It is only known from the slopes of the Kammanassie massif near Uniondale in South Africa.

The wingspan is 41–60 mm for males and 52–58 mm for females. Adults are on wing from November to January (with a peak in December). There is one generation per year

The larvae probably feed on various Poaceae species, probably including Merxmuellera species.
