= Dingana alticola =

Red-banded widow

Scientific classification
- Domain: Eukaryota
- Kingdom: Animalia
- Phylum: Arthropoda
- Class: Insecta
- Order: Lepidoptera
- Family: Nymphalidae
- Genus: Dingana
- Species: D. alticola

Binomial name
- Dingana alticola Henning & Henning, 1996

Species of butterfly

Dingana alticola, the red-banded widow, is a butterfly of the family Nymphalidae. It is only known from high altitude grassland in the Steenkampsberg area in the Mpumalanga province.

== Description ==
The wingspan is 57–64 mm for males and 56–61 mm for females. Adults are on wing from September to November (with a peak in October). There is one generation per year.

== Habitat and behavior ==
Similar to D. angusta, these butterflies are associated with Lydenburg Montane Grassland (Gm 18). The species is found at 2100 metres altitude on a rocky ridge along Verlorenvallei dirt road.

The larvae feed on various Poaceae species.
