= Torynesis orangica =

Golden Gate widow

Scientific classification
- Domain: Eukaryota
- Kingdom: Animalia
- Phylum: Arthropoda
- Class: Insecta
- Order: Lepidoptera
- Family: Nymphalidae
- Genus: Torynesis
- Species: T. orangica

Binomial name
- Torynesis orangica Vári, 1971

Species of butterfly

Torynesis orangica, the Golden Gate widow, is a butterfly of the family Nymphalidae. It is only known to be found in Brandwag Buttress and Mushroom Rocks in the Golden Gate Highlands and Titanic Rock near Clarens in Free State.

The wingspan of the Golden Gate widow is 42–52 mm for males and 45–55 mm for females. Adults are on the wing from late December to early February (with a peak in January). There is one generation per year

The larvae feed on various Poaceae species, including Merxmuellera species.
