= Dingana dingana =

Dingaan's widow

Scientific classification
- Domain: Eukaryota
- Kingdom: Animalia
- Phylum: Arthropoda
- Class: Insecta
- Order: Lepidoptera
- Family: Nymphalidae
- Genus: Dingana
- Species: D. dingana

Binomial name
- Dingana dingana (Trimen, 1873)

Synonyms
- Leptoneura dingana Trimen, 1873

Species of butterfly

Dingana dingana, or Dingaan's widow, is a butterfly of the family Nymphalidae. It is found in the KwaZulu-Natal midfields from the Drakensberg foothills to the Mooi River.

The wingspan is 58–62 mm for males and 55–60 mm for females. Adults are on wing from September to October (with a peak in October). There is one generation per year

The larvae probably feed on various Poaceae species, including Ehrharta erecta and Pennisetum clandestinum.
