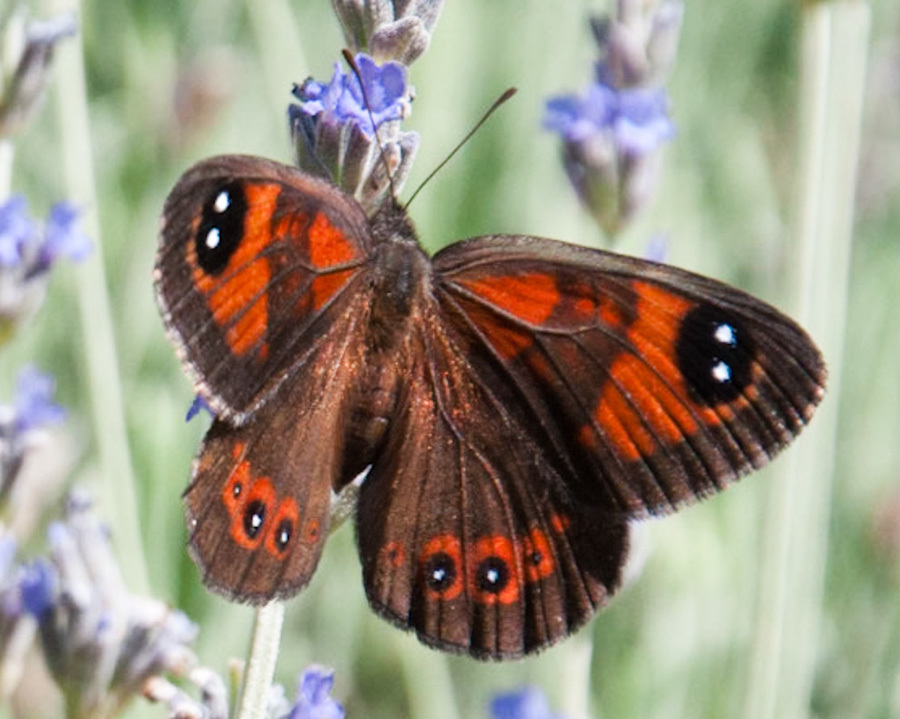

Scientific classification
- Domain: Eukaryota
- Kingdom: Animalia
- Phylum: Arthropoda
- Class: Insecta
- Order: Lepidoptera
- Family: Nymphalidae
- Genus: Tarsocera
- Species: T. namaquensis

Binomial name
- Tarsocera namaquensis Vári, 1971

= Tarsocera namaquensis =

Namaqua widow

Species of butterfly

Tarsocera namaquensis, the Namaqua widow, is a butterfly of the family Nymphalidae. It is found in South Africa, from Steinkopf in Namaqualand south to Nieuwoudtville in the Northern Cape.

The wingspan is 38–48 mm for males and 42–50 mm for females. Adults are on wing from August to October (with a peak in September). There is one generation per year

The larvae probably feed on Poaceae species.
