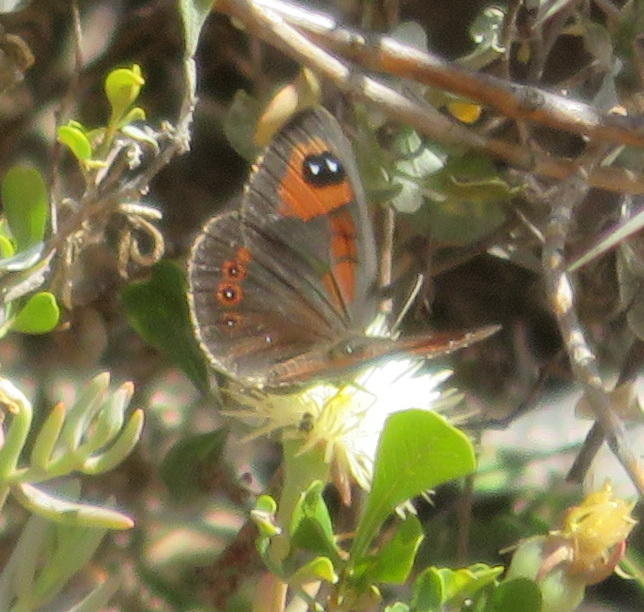

Scientific classification
- Domain: Eukaryota
- Kingdom: Animalia
- Phylum: Arthropoda
- Class: Insecta
- Order: Lepidoptera
- Family: Nymphalidae
- Genus: Tarsocera
- Species: T. fulvina

Binomial name
- Tarsocera fulvina Vári, 1971

= Tarsocera fulvina =

Karoo widow

Species of butterfly

Tarsocera fulvina, the Karoo widow, is a butterfly of the family Nymphalidae. It is found in South Africa in the western Cape from the Hex River Mountains to the Roggeveld escarpment and the Sneeuberg, south to Grootwindhoekberge in the eastern Cape.

The wingspan is 42–52 mm for males and 50–57 mm for females. Adults are on wing from September to December (with a peak in October or November). There is one generation per year

The larvae probably feed on various Poaceae species.
