= Dingana fraterna =

Stoffberg widow

Conservation status
- Critically Endangered (IUCN 3.1)

Scientific classification
- Domain: Eukaryota
- Kingdom: Animalia
- Phylum: Arthropoda
- Class: Insecta
- Order: Lepidoptera
- Family: Nymphalidae
- Genus: Dingana
- Species: D. fraterna

Binomial name
- Dingana fraterna Henning & Henning, 1996

Species of butterfly

Dingana fraterna, the Stoffberg widow, is a butterfly of the family Nymphalidae. It is only known from one hillside to the south-west of the Stoffberg in the Mpumalanga province.

== Description ==
The wingspan is 56–61 mm for males and 55–57 mm for females. Adults are on wing from mid-to late October. There is one generation per year

Similar to D. angusta, this butterfly features white and orange postdiscal spots on the upperside of forewing.

== Habitat and behavior ==
This butterfly is associated with Sekhukhune Montane Grassland (Gm 19) (Mucina and Rutherford).

The larvae feed on various Poaceae species.
