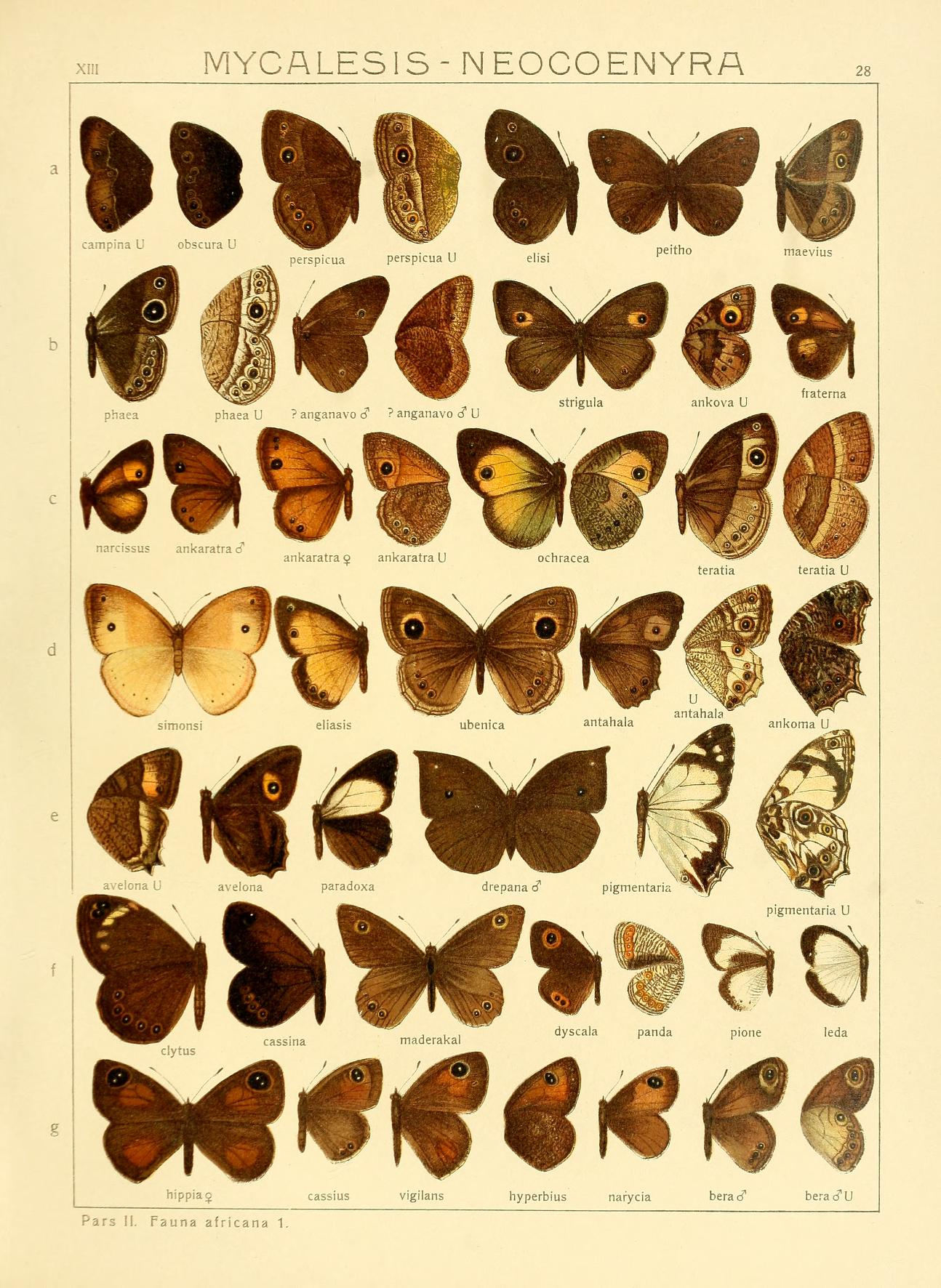
- In Adalbert Seitz's Fauna Africana

Scientific classification
- Kingdom: Animalia
- Phylum: Arthropoda
- Class: Insecta
- Order: Lepidoptera
- Family: Nymphalidae
- Genus: Tarsocera
- Species: T. cassina

Binomial name
- Tarsocera cassina (Butler, 1868)

Synonyms
- Leptoneura cassina Butler, 1868

= Tarsocera cassina =

Sand-dune widow

Species of butterfly

Tarsocera cassina, the sand-dune widow, is a butterfly of the family Nymphalidae. It is found in South Africa in the Western Cape along the coast from Lambert's Bay to Bredasdorp.

The wingspan is 35–40 mm for males and 40–45 mm for females. Adults are on wing from September/October to November. There is one generation per year

The larvae feed on various Poaceae species, including Lolium species and Brachypodium distachyum.
