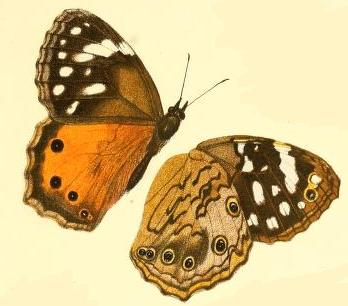

Scientific classification
- Domain: Eukaryota
- Kingdom: Animalia
- Phylum: Arthropoda
- Class: Insecta
- Order: Lepidoptera
- Family: Nymphalidae
- Subfamily: Satyrinae
- Tribe: Dirini
- Genus: Paralethe van Son, 1955
- Species: P. dendrophilus

Binomial name
- Paralethe dendrophilus (Trimen, 1862)

Synonyms
- Satyrus dendrophilus Trimen, 1862; Paralethe dendrophilus albina f. alticola van Son, 1955; Debis indosa Trimen, 1879; Lethe dendrophilus var. albomaculatus Staudinger, 1887; Meneris dendrophilus junodi van Son, 1935

= Paralethe =

Genus of butterflies

Paralethe is a monotypic butterfly genus in the family Nymphalidae. Its one species - Paralethe dendrophilus - the "bush beauty" or "forest pride" is found in South Africa.

The wingspan is 45–60 mm for males and 48–70 mm for females. Adults are on wing from late December to May. There is one generation per year.

The larvae feed on various Poaceae species, including Ehrharta erecta and Panicum deustrum.

== Subspecies ==
- Paralethe dendrophilus dendrophilus (eastern Cape)
- Paralethe dendrophilus albina van Son, 1955 (eastern Cape (Pondoland), Natal)
- Paralethe dendrophilus indosa (Trimen, 1879) (coast of KwaZulu-Natal and Zululand)
- Paralethe dendrophilus junodi (van Son, 1935) (Transvaal)
