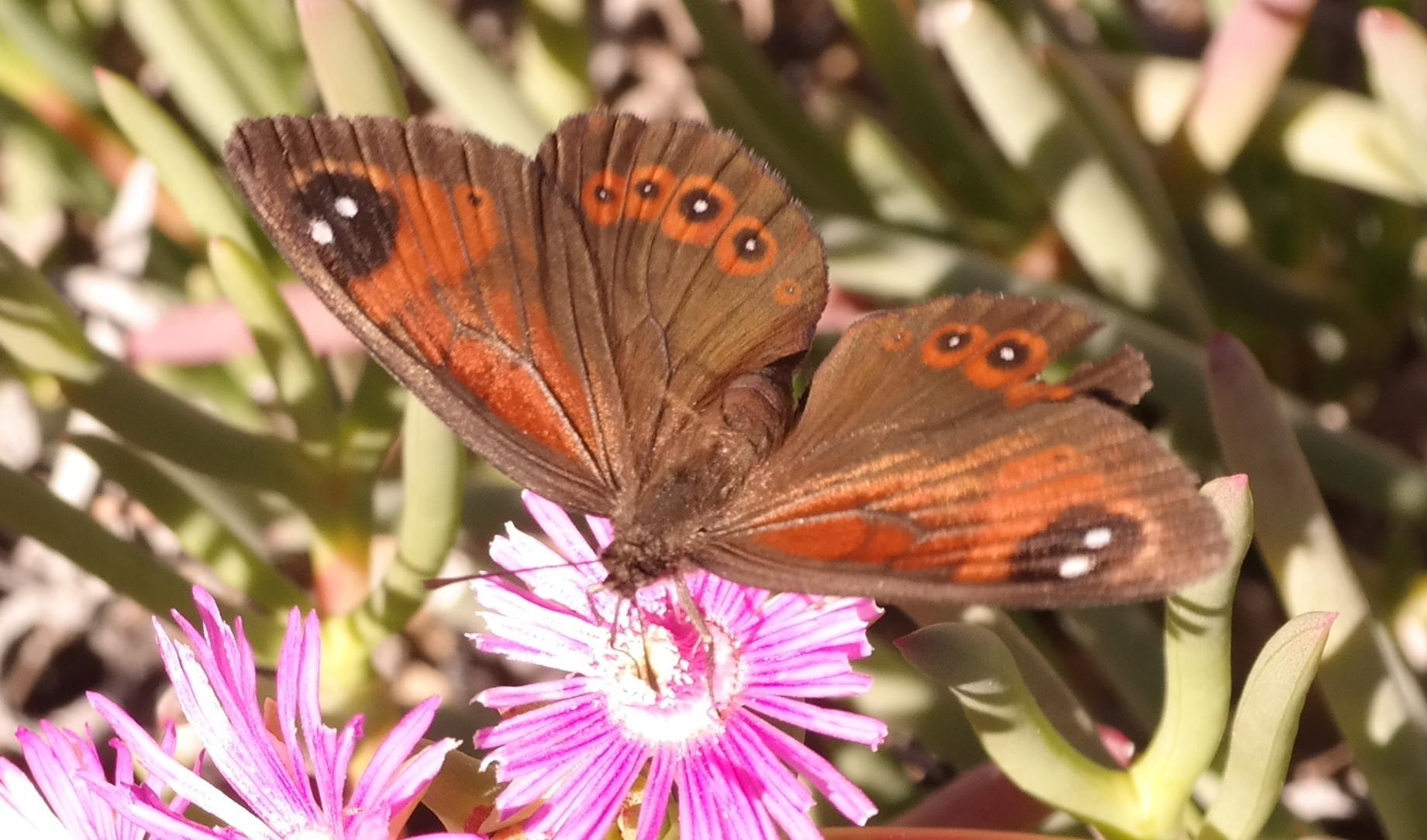

Scientific classification
- Domain: Eukaryota
- Kingdom: Animalia
- Phylum: Arthropoda
- Class: Insecta
- Order: Lepidoptera
- Family: Nymphalidae
- Genus: Tarsocera
- Species: T. dicksoni

Binomial name
- Tarsocera dicksoni (van Son, 1962)

Synonyms
- Cassus dicksoni van Son, 1962

= Tarsocera dicksoni =

Dickson's widow

Species of butterfly

Tarsocera dicksoni, or Dickson's widow, is a butterfly of the family Nymphalidae. It is found in South Africa, in the Northern and Western Cape from Springbok south and west to Piketberg and east, and to the Swartberg Pass.

The wingspan is 42–52 mm for males and 50–57 mm for females. Adults are seen on wing from September to early December (with a peak in October or November). There is one generation per year.

The larvae are believed to feed on various Poaceae species.
