= Dingana angusta =

Scientific classification
- Domain: Eukaryota
- Kingdom: Animalia
- Phylum: Arthropoda
- Class: Insecta
- Order: Lepidoptera
- Family: Nymphalidae
- Genus: Dingana
- Species: D. angusta

Binomial name
- Dingana angusta Henning & Henning, 1996

Species of butterfly

Dingana angusta, the narrow-banded widow, is a butterfly of the family Nymphalidae. It is found in grasslands the eastern highlands from northern Eswatini to Mpumalanga and the Limpopo Province.

== Description ==
The wingspan is 60–65 mm for males and 56–62 mm for females. Adults are on wing from September to November (with a peak in October). There is one generation per year.

Similar to D. fraterna, this butterfly features white and orange postdiscal spots on the upperside of forewing.

== Habitat and behavior ==
This butterfly is associated with Lydenburg Montane Grassland (Gm 18).

The larvae feed on various Poaceae species, including Pennisetum clandestinum.
