= Tarsocera imitator =

Deceptive widow

Scientific classification
- Kingdom: Animalia
- Phylum: Arthropoda
- Clade: Pancrustacea
- Class: Insecta
- Order: Lepidoptera
- Family: Nymphalidae
- Genus: Tarsocera
- Species: T. imitator

Binomial name
- Tarsocera imitator Vári, 1971

Synonyms
- Tarsocera imitator ab. aperta Vári, 1971; Tarsocera imitator ab. cassinodes Vári, 1971

Species of butterfly

Tarsocera imitator, the deceptive widow, is a butterfly of the family Nymphalidae. It is found in South Africa, in Namaqualand, ranging from Steinkopf in the Northern Cape south to the Lambert's Bay area in the Western Cape.

The wingspan is 42–52 mm for males and 50–57 mm for females. Adults are on wing from September to October. There is one generation per year.
