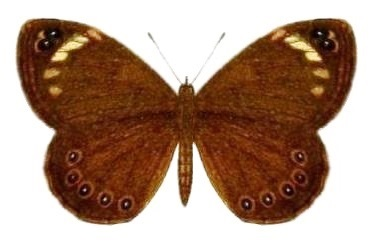
- D. clytus depicted in Seitz's Fauna Africana

Scientific classification
- Domain: Eukaryota
- Kingdom: Animalia
- Phylum: Arthropoda
- Class: Insecta
- Order: Lepidoptera
- Family: Nymphalidae
- Tribe: Dirini
- Genus: Dira; Hübner, 1819

Diversity
- Four species

= Dira (butterfly) =

Genus of butterflies

Dira is a genus of butterflies from the subfamily Satyrinae in the family Nymphalidae.

== Species ==
- Dira clytus (Linnaeus, 1764)
- Dira jansei (Swierstra, 1911)
- Dira oxylus (Trimen, 1881)
- Dira swanepoeli (van Son, 1939)
