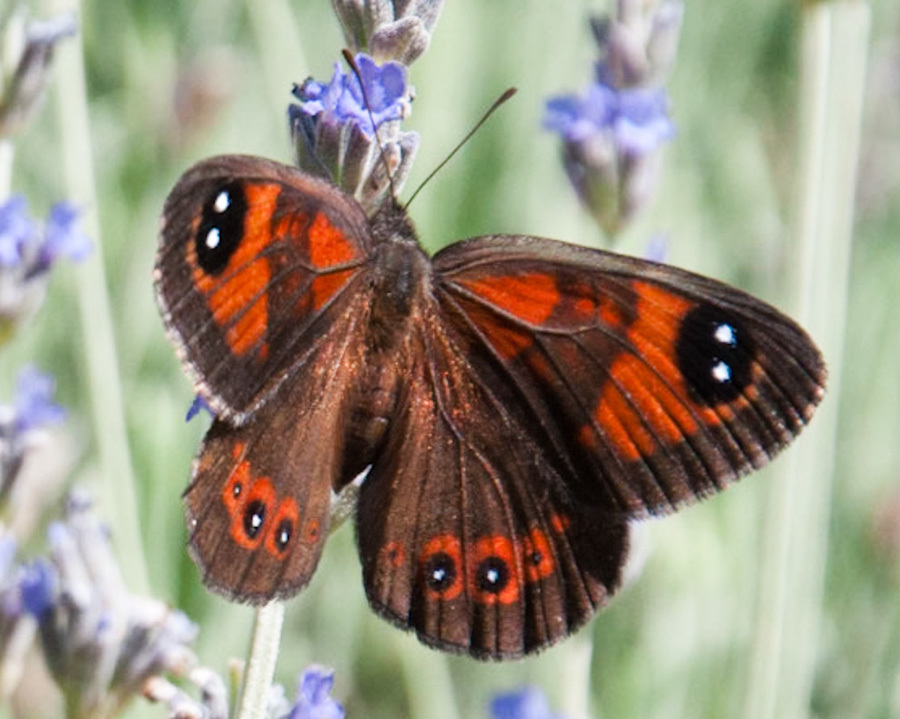
- Tarsocera namaquensis

Scientific classification
- Domain: Eukaryota
- Kingdom: Animalia
- Phylum: Arthropoda
- Class: Insecta
- Order: Lepidoptera
- Family: Nymphalidae
- Tribe: Dirini
- Genus: Tarsocera; Butler, [1899]

Diversity
- Seven species

Synonyms
- Cassus van Son, 1955

= Tarsocera =

Genus of insects

Tarsocera is a genus of butterflies from the subfamily Satyrinae in the family Nymphalidae.

== Species ==
- Tarsocera cassina (Butler, 1868)
- Tarsocera cassus (Linnaeus, 1764)
- Tarsocera dicksoni (van Son, 1962)
- Tarsocera fulvina Vári, 1971
- Tarsocera imitator Vári, 1971
- Tarsocera namaquensis Vári, 1971
- Tarsocera southeyae Dickson, 1969
