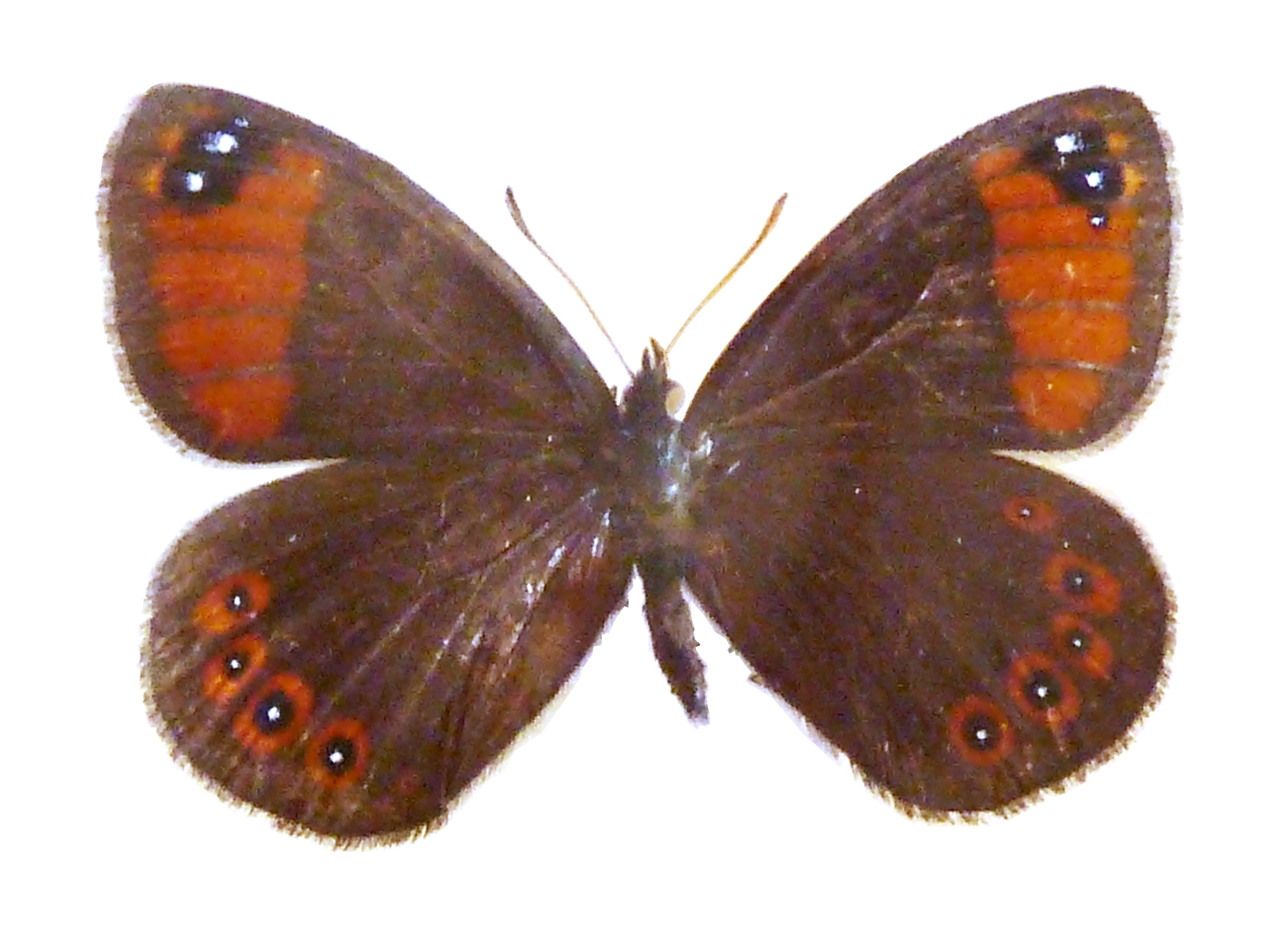
- Dingana alaedeus

Scientific classification
- Domain: Eukaryota
- Kingdom: Animalia
- Phylum: Arthropoda
- Class: Insecta
- Order: Lepidoptera
- Family: Nymphalidae
- Subfamily: Satyrinae
- Tribe: Dirini
- Genus: Dingana van Son, 1955

Diversity
- 10 species

Synonyms
- Serradinga Henning & Henning, 1996

= Dingana =

Genus of butterflies

Dingana is a butterfly genus from the subfamily Satyrinae in the family Nymphalidae.

== Species ==
Subgenus Dingana van Son, 1955

- Dingana alaedeus Henning & Henning, 1984
- Dingana alticola Henning & Henning, 1996
- Dingana angusta Henning & Henning, 1996
- Dingana clara (van Son, 1940)
- Dingana dingana (Trimen, 1873)
- Dingana fraterna Henning & Henning, 1996
- Dingana jerinae Henning & Henning, 1996

Subgenus Serradinga G.A. & S.F. Henning, 1996

- Dingana bowkeri (Trimen, 1870)
- Dingana clarki van Son, 1955
- Dingana kammanassiensis Henning & Henning, 1994
