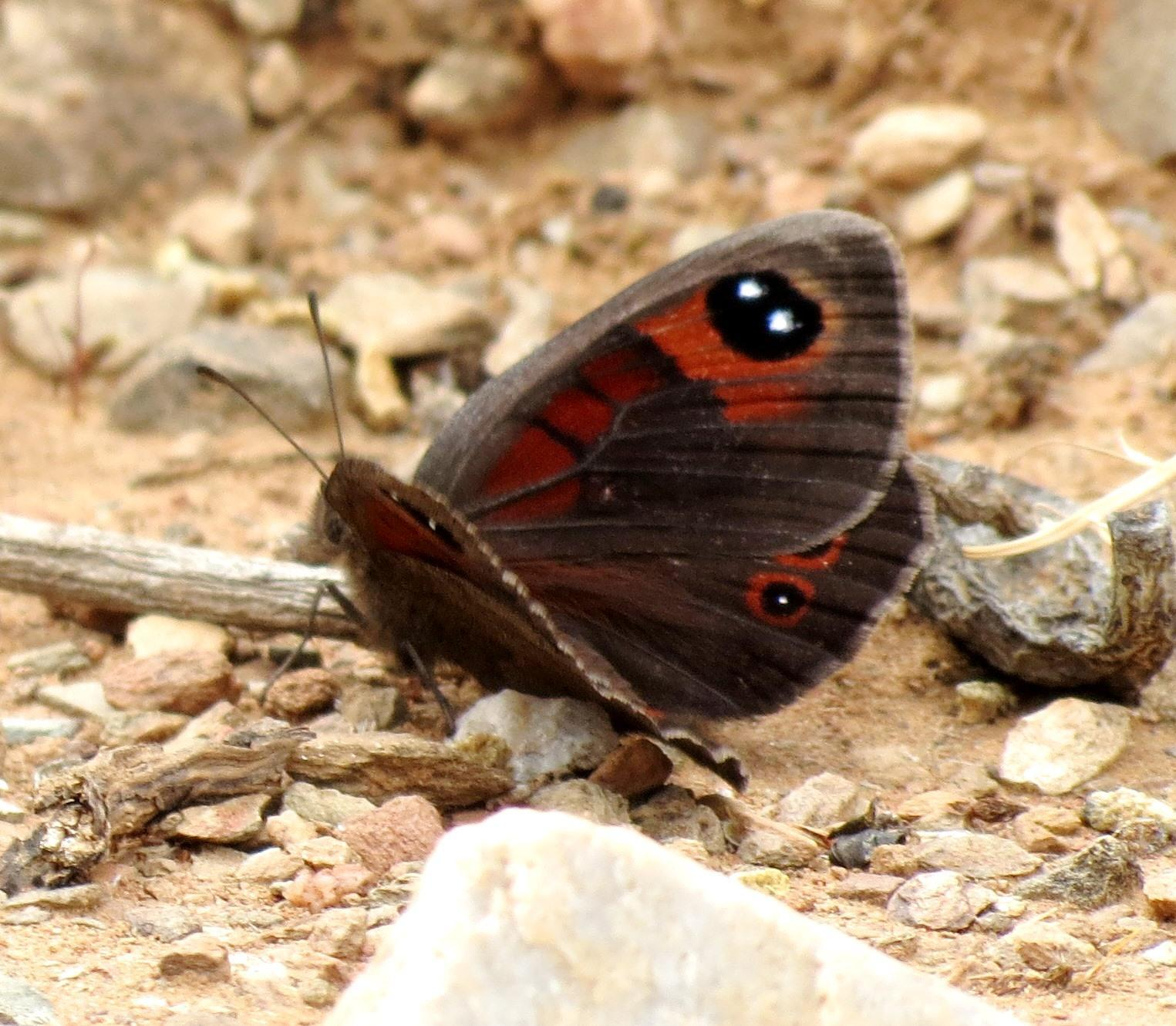

Scientific classification
- Domain: Eukaryota
- Kingdom: Animalia
- Phylum: Arthropoda
- Class: Insecta
- Order: Lepidoptera
- Family: Nymphalidae
- Genus: Tarsocera
- Species: T. southeyae

Binomial name
- Tarsocera southeyae Dickson, 1969

= Tarsocera southeyae =

Southey's widow

Species of butterfly

Tarsocera southeyae, or Southey's widow, is a butterfly of the family Nymphalidae. It is found in South Africa at medium altitudes from Calvinia in the Northern Cape to Willowmore and Jansenville in the Eastern Cape.

The wingspan is 42–52 mm for males and 50–57 mm for females. Adults are on wing from September to November (with a peak in October). There is one generation per year.

The larvae probably feed on various Poaceae species.
