= Dira oxylus =

Pondoland widow

Scientific classification
- Domain: Eukaryota
- Kingdom: Animalia
- Phylum: Arthropoda
- Class: Insecta
- Order: Lepidoptera
- Family: Nymphalidae
- Genus: Dira
- Species: D. oxylus

Binomial name
- Dira oxylus (Trimen, 1881)

Synonyms
- Leptoneura oxylus Trimen, 1881

Species of butterfly

Dira oxylus, the Pondoland widow, is a butterfly of the family Nymphalidae. It is found in from the lower Drakensberg foothills from the eastern Cape to KwaZulu-Natal in South Africa.

The wingspan is 50–60 mm for males and 55–65 mm for females. Adults are on wing from late December to early March. There is one generation per year

The larvae feed on various Poaceae species, including Ehrharta erecta.
