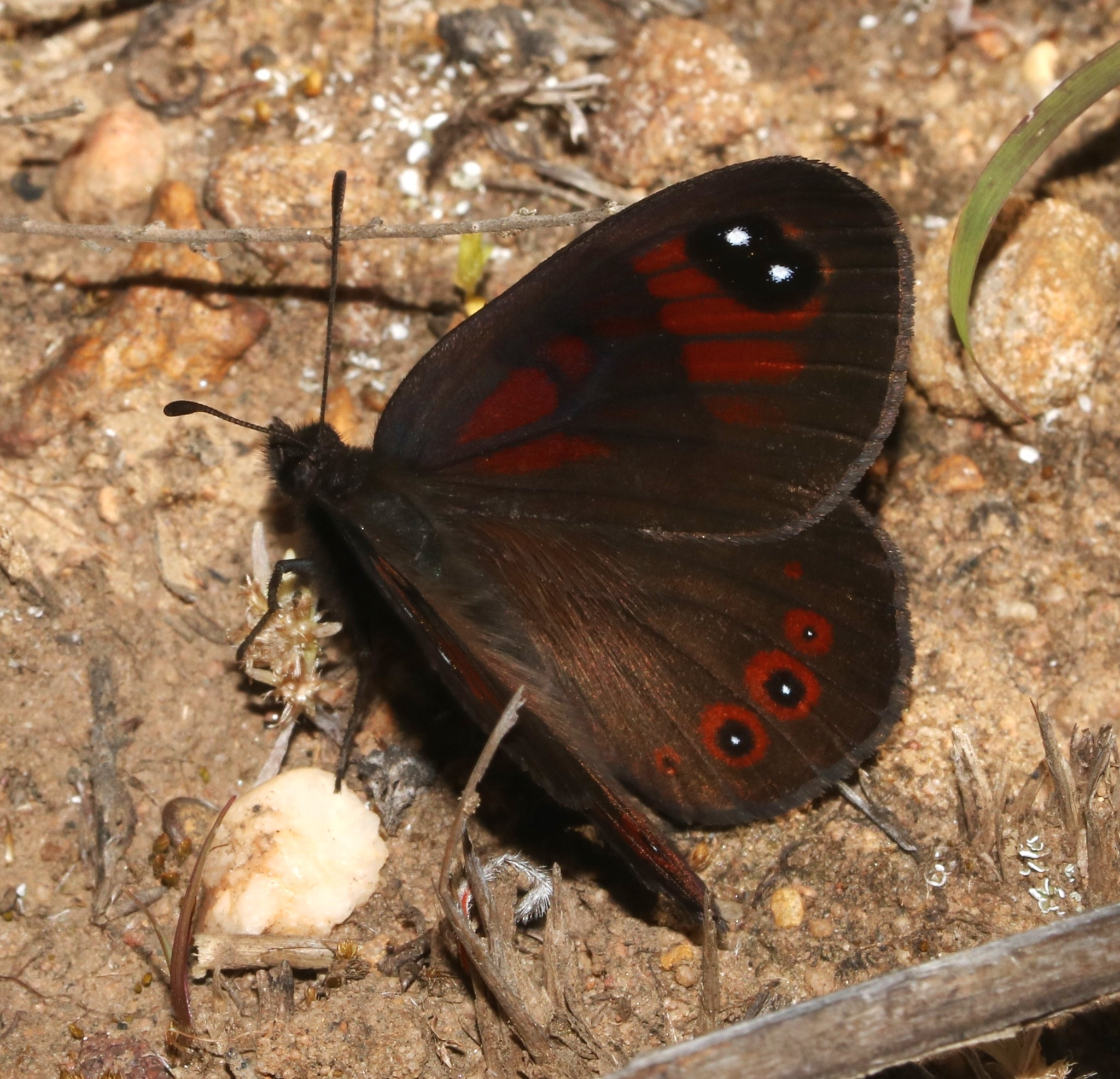

Scientific classification
- Kingdom: Animalia
- Phylum: Arthropoda
- Class: Insecta
- Order: Lepidoptera
- Family: Nymphalidae
- Genus: Tarsocera
- Species: T. cassus

Binomial name
- Tarsocera cassus (Linnaeus, 1764)

Synonyms
- Papilio cassus Linnaeus, 1764; Dira cassus (Linnaeus, 1764)

= Tarsocera cassus =

Spring widow

Species of butterfly

Tarsocera cassus, the spring widow, is a butterfly of the family Nymphalidae. It is found in South Africa.

The wingspan is 42–52 mm for males and 50–57 mm for females. Adults are on wing from September to December (with a peak in October or November). There is one generation per year

The larvae feed on various Poaceae species, including Lolium temulentum and Haparrhenia hirta.

== Subspecies ==
- Tarsocera cassus cassus (northern Cape south to the south-western parts of the West Cape)
- Tarsocera cassus outeniqua Vári, 1971 (Little Karoo and the south-eastern part of the West Cape)
