= Merxmuellera =

Scientific classification
- Kingdom: Plantae
- Clade: Tracheophytes
- Clade: Angiosperms
- Clade: Monocots
- Clade: Commelinids
- Order: Poales
- Family: Poaceae
- Subfamily: Danthonioideae
- Tribe: Danthonieae
- Genus: Merxmuellera; Conert

Type species
- Merxmuellera davyi (C.E.Hubb.) Conert.

Genus of African grasses

Merxmuellera is a genus of African grasses named for Hermann Merxmueller, a 20th-century German botanist and taxonomist who was an expert on African flora.

== Species ==
Merxmuellera contains the following species:

- Merxmuellera ambalavaoensis (A.Camus) Conert - Madagascar
- Merxmuellera davyi (C.E.Hubb.) Conert - Malawi, Mozambique, Zimbabwe, Limpopo
- Merxmuellera drakensbergensis (Schweick.) Conert - Cape Province, Lesotho, Free State, KwaZulu-Natal, Mpumalanga, Limpopo
- Merxmuellera grandiflora (Hochst. ex A.Rich.) H.P.Linder - Ethiopia
- Merxmuellera macowanii (Stapf) Conert - Cape Province, Lesotho, Free State, KwaZulu-Natal, Mpumalanga, Limpopo, Madagascar
- Merxmuellera stereophylla (J.G.Anderson) Conert - Lesotho, Free State, KwaZulu-Natal, Mpumalanga, Limpopo
- Merxmuellera tsaratananensis (A.Camus) Conert - Madagascar

=== Formerly included ===
Merxmuellera formerly contained the following species:

- M. arundinacea - Capeochloa arundinacea
- M. aureocephala - Tenaxia aureocephala
- M. cincta - Capeochloa cincta
- M. decora - Geochloa decora
- M. disticha - Tenaxia disticha
- M. dura - Tenaxia dura
- M. guillarmodiae - Tenaxia guillarmodiae
- M. lupulina - Geochloa lupulina
- M. papposa - Ellisochloa papposa
- M. rangei - Ellisochloa rangei
- M. rufa - Geochloa rufa
- M. setacea - Capeochloa setacea
- M. stricta - Tenaxia stricta

== See also ==
- List of Poaceae genera
