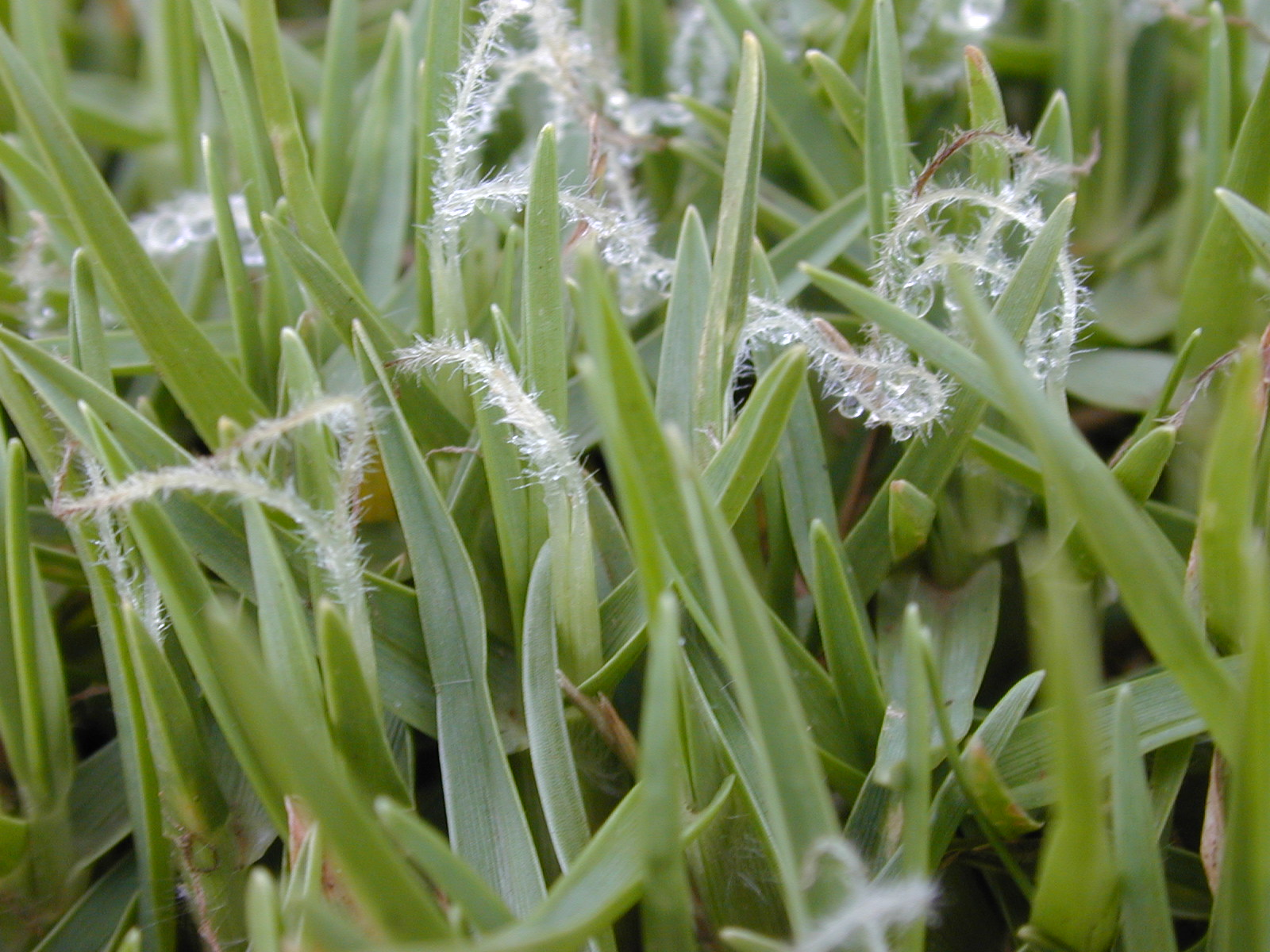

Scientific classification
- Kingdom: Plantae
- Clade: Tracheophytes
- Clade: Angiosperms
- Clade: Monocots
- Clade: Commelinids
- Order: Poales
- Family: Poaceae
- Subfamily: Panicoideae
- Genus: Cenchrus
- Species: C. clandestinus

Binomial name
- Cenchrus clandestinus (Hochst. ex Chiov.) Morrone

Synonyms
- Kikuyuochloa clandestina (Hochst. ex Chiov.) H.Scholz; Pennisetum clandestinum Hochst. ex Chiov.; Pennisetum longistylum var. clandestinum (Hochst. ex Chiov.) Leeke

= Cenchrus clandestinus =

Species of plant

The tropical grass species Cenchrus clandestinus (previously Pennisetum clandestinum) is known by several common names, most often Kikuyu grass. It is native to the highland regions of East Africa that is home to the Kikuyu people. Because of its rapid growth and aggressive nature, it is categorised as a noxious weed in some regions. However, it is also a popular garden lawn species in Australia, New Zealand, South Africa and the southern region of California in the United States, being inexpensive and moderately drought-tolerant. In addition, it is useful as pasture for livestock grazing and serves as a food source for many avian species, including the long-tailed widowbird. The flowering culms are very short and "hidden" amongst the leaves, giving this species its specific epithet (clandestinus).

== Description and habitat ==
Cenchrus clandestinus is a rhizomatous grass with matted roots and a grass-like or herbaceous habit. The leaves are green, flattened or upwardly folded along the midrib, 10–150 mm (0.39–5.91 in) long, and 1–5 mm (0.039–0.197 in) wide. The apex of the leaf blade is obtuse.

It occurs in sandy soil and reaches a height of between 70 and 150 millimetres (2.8 and 5.9 in). The species favours moist areas and frequently becomes naturalised from introduction as a cultivated alien. Rooted nodes send up bunches of grass blades. It is native to the low-elevation tropics of Kenya and environs, where it grows best in humid heat, such as the wet coastal areas.

The description of this species was published by Emilio Chiovenda in 1903, and acknowledges an earlier, invalid, description made by C. F. Hochstetter.

== As an invasive species ==
It has been introduced across Africa, Asia, Australia, the Americas, and the Pacific, where it is subject to eradication through management practices. The ease of cultivation, and the thickly matting habit, have made this species desirable for use as a lawn. In southern California in the United States, the grass is commonly used on golf courses since it is drought resistant and creates challenging rough. The famed Riviera Country Club and Torrey Pines Golf Course both use this grass and host tournaments on the PGA Tour. Other minor golf courses in southern California have Kikuyu grass, many are in Long Beach: Lakewood, Skylinks, Big recreation, Little recreation, El Dorado, San Luis Obispo CC, and others.

The aggressive colonisation of natural habitat has resulted in this grass becoming naturalised in regions such as Southwest Australia. It has high invasive potential due to its elongate rhizomes and stolons, with which it penetrates the ground, rapidly forming dense mats, and suppressing other plant species. It grows from a thick network of rhizomatous roots and sends out stolons which extend along the ground.

It can climb over other plant life, shading it out and producing herbicidal toxins that kill competing plants. It prevents new sprouts of other species from growing, may kill small trees and can choke ponds and waterways. It is resistant to mowing and grazing due to its strong network of roots, which easily send up new shoots. It springs up in turfs and lawns and can damage buildings by growing in the gaps between stones and tiles. The plant is easily introduced to new areas on plowing and digging machinery, which may transfer bits of the rhizome in soil clumps. While the grass spreads well via vegetative reproduction from pieces of rhizome, it is also dispersed via seed. Rhizomes that have reached very hard-to-reach places will continue to grow as separate plants if they are snapped off during the attempted removal process.
