= Gurupa várzea =

Ecoregion in Brazil

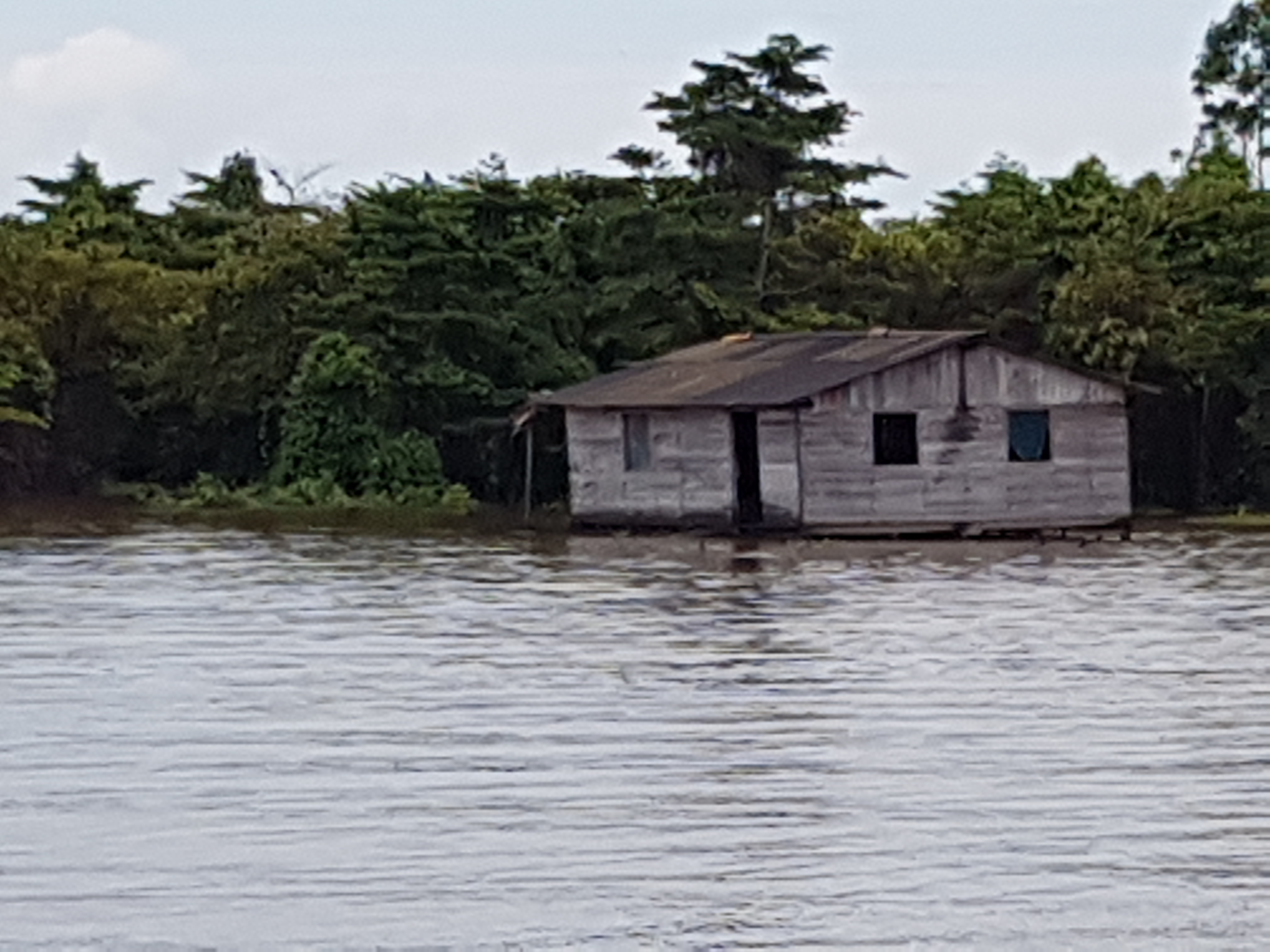
- Riverside house on the Amazon River south of Almeirim, Pará

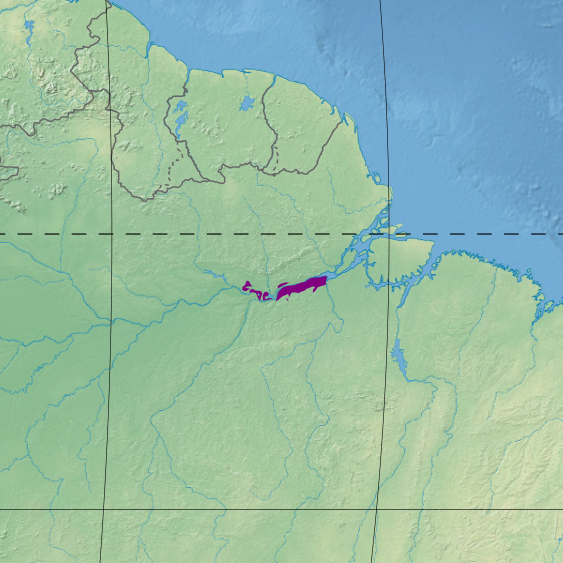
- Ecoregion territory (in purple)

Ecology
- Realm: Neotropical
- Biome: Tropical and subtropical moist broadleaf forests – Amazon

Geography
- Area: 9,841.95 km^{2} (3,800.00 sq mi)
- Country: Brazil
- Coordinates: 1.910°S 53.268°W

The Gurupa várzea (NT0126) is an ecoregion of seasonally and tidally flooded várzea forest along the Amazon River in the Amazon biome.

== Location ==
The Gurupa várzea ecoregion is named after the Ilha Grande de Gurupá, an alluvial island in the mouth of the Amazon. The várzea extends along the lower Amazon River from the mouth of the Tapajós down to the mouth of the Xingu River. It has an area of 984,195 hectares (2,432,000 acres). The Tapajós–Xingu moist forests lie to the south and the Uatuma–Trombetas moist forests to the north. The Monte Alegre várzea is upstream and the Marajó várzea is downstream along the Amazon.

== Physical ==
In this region the whitewater Amazon is fed by the blackwater Xingú, Jari, and Tapajós rivers. Elevations are no more than 5 metres (16 ft). The Gurupa várzea contains floodplains along the river that are affected by daily Atlantic Ocean tidal fluctuations and seasonal flooding. At the height of the rainy season when the Amazon is in full flood water levels may fluctuate by 4 to 7 metres (13 to 23 ft) in a tidal period as the river water is dammed by the rising ocean tide. Outside the rainy season fluctuations may still be from 2 to 3 metres (6 ft 7 in to 9 ft 10 in) in a tidal period.

The region contains a complex maze of channels and sedimentary islands. The soil is made up of sediments carried from the eastern Andes by the rivers during the present Holocene epoch. The river sediments form levees along the margin of the river, behind which are areas of savanna on clay soil and open lakes. Both the savanna and the lakes flood daily, and the lakes grow much larger at the height of the flood season.

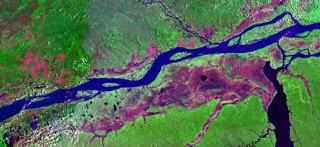
Eastern Gurupa várzea (purple). Amazon river is blue and Xingu river almost black in this image

== Ecology ==
The ecoregion is in the Neotropical realm and the tropical and subtropical moist broadleaf forests biome.

=== Climate ===
The Köppen climate classification is "Am": equatorial, monsoon rainfall. Temperatures are fairly steady throughout the year, ranging from 23 to 32 °C (73 to 90 °F) with an average of 28 °C (82 °F). Mean annual precipitation is about 1,900 millimetres (75 in), with rainfall varying from 29.7 millimetres (1.17 in) in October to 316.1 millimetres (12.44 in) in April.

=== Flora ===
The levees hold tropical rainforest with a height of around 25 metres (82 ft). Behind them the ecoregion holds a distinctive form of várzea that is mostly savanna rather than dense rainforest. The clay soil supports robust savanna known as canarana. The rich sediments make the várzea very fertile compared to the terra firme land further from the river. The vegetation stabilizes the soil and is home to a very diverse population of aquatic mammals and freshwater fish.

The flooded savanna holds large grasses such as Echinochloa polystachya, Echinochloa spectabilis, Hymenachne amplexicaulis, Hymenachne donacifolia, Leersia hexandra, Paspalum platyaxix, Luziola spruceana, Panicum elephantipes, Paspalum fasciculatum and several Oryza species. Some of the grasses also grow on former channels of the river. Among the grasses there are sedges such as Scirpus cubensis, Cyperus luzulae, Cyperus ferax and Scleria geniculata. The areas of transition between the forest and river hold shrubs and small vines that include Artemisia artemisiifolia, Ipomoea carnea, Polygonum punctatusm, Justicia obtusifolia, Alternanthera philoxeroides, Capironia fistulosa, Sesbania exasperata, Mimosa pigra, Montrichardia linifolia, Clamatis aculeata, Senna reticulata, Phaseolus lineatus, Rhabdadenia macrostoma and Clitonia triquetum.

The forest holds larger trees such as Hura crepitans, Triplaris surinamensis, Calycophyllum spruceanum, Cedrela oderata, Pseudobombax munguba, Virola surinamensis and Ceiba pentandra. A variety of trees produce fleshy fruit that supports species of fruit eating primates, bats and fish that enter the forest when it is flooded. These include yellow mombim (Spondias mombim), buriti palm (Mauritia flexuosa), açaí palm (Euterpe oleracea), socoró (Mouriri ulei) and tarumã (Vitex cymosa).

=== Fauna ===
This ecoregion hosts 148 mammal species including ocelot (Leopardus pardalis), margay (Leopardus wiedii), South American tapir (Tapirus terrestris), capybara (Hydrochoerus hydrochaeris), kinkajou (Potos flavus), white-lipped peccary (Tayassu pecari), red-faced spider monkey (Ateles paniscus) and Venezuelan red howler (Alouatta seniculus). Endemic mammals include red-handed tamarin (Saguinus midas), bare-eared squirrel monkey (Saimiri ustus), red-bellied titi (Callicebus moloch), silvery marmoset (Mico argentatus), black dwarf porcupine (Coendou nycthemera), red acouchi (Myoprocta acouchy), white-faced spiny tree-rat (Echimys chrysurus), giant tree rat (Toromys grandis), crab-eating fox (Cerdocyon thous) and several species of bat. Endangered mammals include the white-cheeked spider monkey (Ateles marginatus), white-nosed saki (Chiropotes albinasus) and giant otter (Pteronura brasiliensis).

558 bird species have been recorded, including herons and egrets (genera Egretta and Ardea), whistling duck (subfamily Dendrocygninae), sharp-tailed ibis (Cercibis oxycerca) ibis (Theristicus species), roseate spoonbill (Platalea ajaja), dark-winged trumpeter (Psophia viridis), eared dove (Zenaida auriculata), crimson topaz (Topaza pella), scaled spinetail (Cranioleuca muelleri) and spectacled thrush (Turdus nudigenis). Endangered birds include the scaled spinetail (Cranioleuca muelleri) and yellow-bellied seedeater (Sporophila nigricollis)

The waters are home to many fish and turtles, including Arrau turtle (Podocnemis expansa). The largest fish include pacu (genera Metynnis and Mylossoma), tambaqui (Colossoma macropomum), pirarucu (Arapaima gigas) and sardinha (Triportheus angulatus). Other fish include piranha (genus Serrasalmus), discus (Symphysodon aequifasciatus), cichlids, characins (family Anostomidae), tetras (genera Hemigrammus and Hyphessobrycon), and catfish (families Aspredinidae, Callichthyidae, Doradidae and Loricariidae).

=== Status ===
As of 2017 the World Wildlife Fund classed the ecoregion as "Critical/Endangered". Human activities in the ecoregion include fishing, subsistence agriculture, selective logging and cattle or water buffalo ranching. The small-scale farmers typically practice diverse agriculture that depends on the forest and does not degrade the land. In the past, large scale production of jute damaged the environment, and mechanized rice production continues today. Elsewhere large areas of natural forest along the Amazon banks have been cleared and the savanna converted to pasturage. Most of the commercially value timber species such as Virola surinamensis and Ceiba pentandra have been harvested. The remaining forest is mostly secondary growth, either managed or unmanaged. Urban sprawl in the city of Monte Alegre has also affected the ecoregion.

== Sources ==
- Amazon Basin Ecoregions, Yale University, archived from the original on 2021-01-23
- "Gurupa varzea", Global Species, Myers Enterprises II
- Sears, Robin, Northern South America: Northeastern Brazil: NT0126, WWF: World Wildlife Fund
- WildFinder, WWF: World Wildlife Fund
