= Cyperus flexuosus =

Cyperus flexuosus may refer to two different plant species:

- Cyperus flexuosus Vahl, a synonym for Cyperus ferax
- Cyperus flexuosus Griseb., a synonym for Cyperus odoratus
