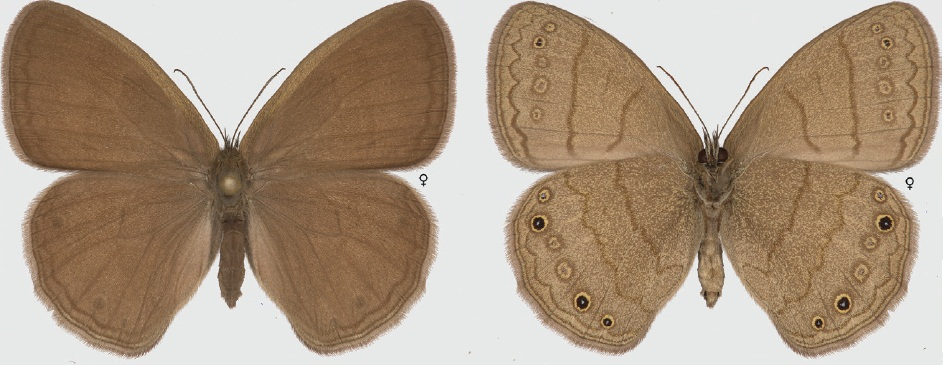
- Female
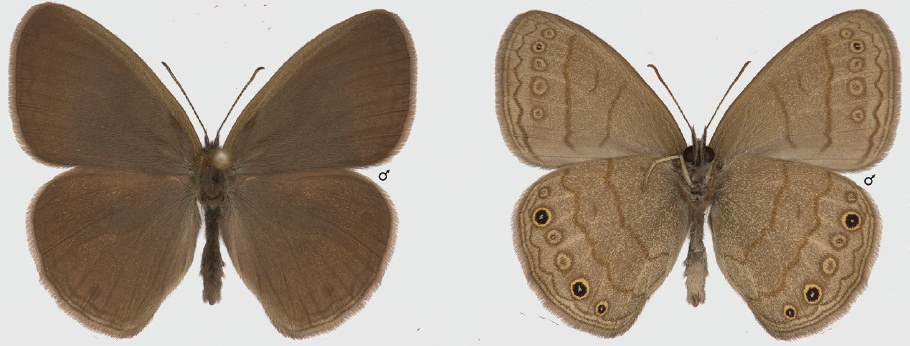
- Male

Scientific classification
- Kingdom: Animalia
- Phylum: Arthropoda
- Class: Insecta
- Order: Lepidoptera
- Family: Nymphalidae
- Genus: Hermeuptychia
- Species: H. hermybius

Binomial name
- Hermeuptychia hermybius Grishin, 2014

= Hermeuptychia hermybius =

Species of butterfly

Hermeuptychia hermybius is a butterfly of the family Nymphalidae. It has been recorded in southern North America from the lower Rio Grande Valley region of Texas, along the Rio Grande from Laredo to the Gulf coast. It is also found in neighbouring Mexico (Tamaulipas, San Luis Potosí).

The length of the forewings is 16 mm.

The larvae feed on Panicum maximus.

== Etymology ==
The species name refers to a fusion of the two words herm[es] beginning and [sos]ybius referring to Hermeuptychia hermes and Hermeuptychia sosybius.

== Life history ==
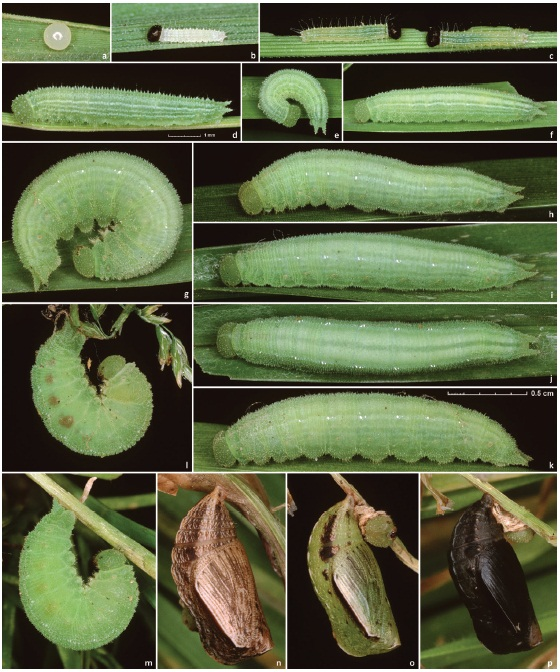
Life cycle of H. hermybius - Cameron County, Texas, 2003 Images show different individuals. Those that eclosed are paratypes. Images a–d are enlarged two times (scale on d) compared to the rest (scale on k). a ovum, January 23 b first instar, prior to feeding, thus white, January 30 c two caterpillars resting in a typical head-to-head position, February 1 d second instar, February 10 e third instar, February 14 f February 15 g–k fourth (ultimate) instars, February 25, 28, 26, 26 and 25 - g is in a curled position adopted when disturbed l–m prepupae, February 26 and 23 n–p pupae, March 10, February 25 and March 4 - n is a brown form, shed larval skin is still attached near cremaster in o and p and is hanging behind the pupa in n, p near eclosion, dark adult is seen through semi-transparent pupal cuticle
