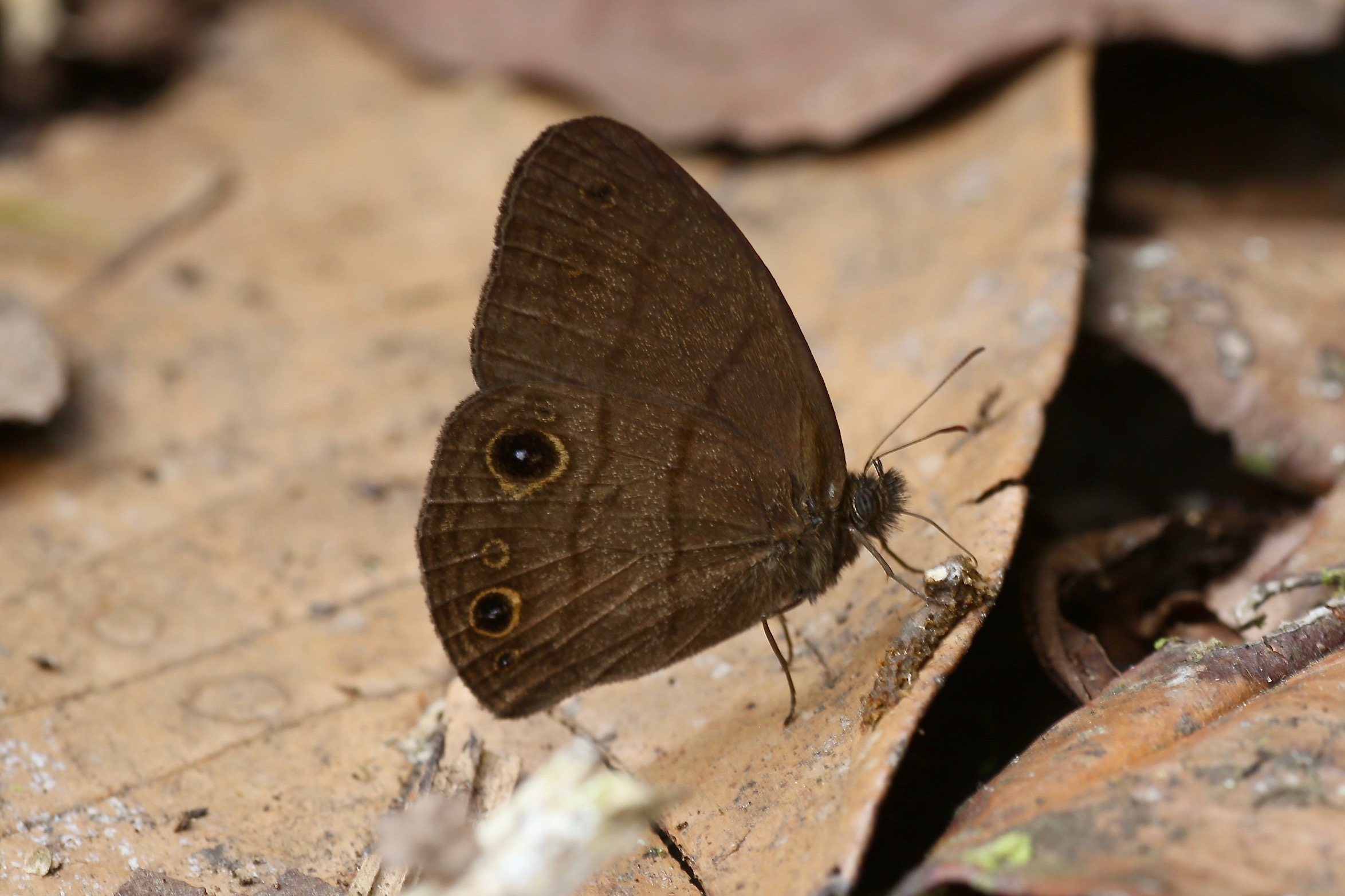
- Hermeuptychia harmonia, Ecuador, Mindo

Scientific classification
- Kingdom: Animalia
- Phylum: Arthropoda
- Class: Insecta
- Order: Lepidoptera
- Family: Nymphalidae
- Genus: Hermeuptychia
- Species: H. harmonia

Binomial name
- Hermeuptychia harmonia (Butler, 1867)

Synonyms
- Euptychia harmonia Butler, 1867; Euptychia calixta Butler, 1877; Euptychia cucullixta Weymer, 1911

= Hermeuptychia harmonia =

Species of butterfly

Hermeuptychia harmonia is a species of butterfly in the family Nymphalidae. It was described by Arthur Gardiner Butler in 1867. It is found from Costa Rica to Ecuador, Colombia, and Peru. The larvae feed on Cyperus luzulae.
