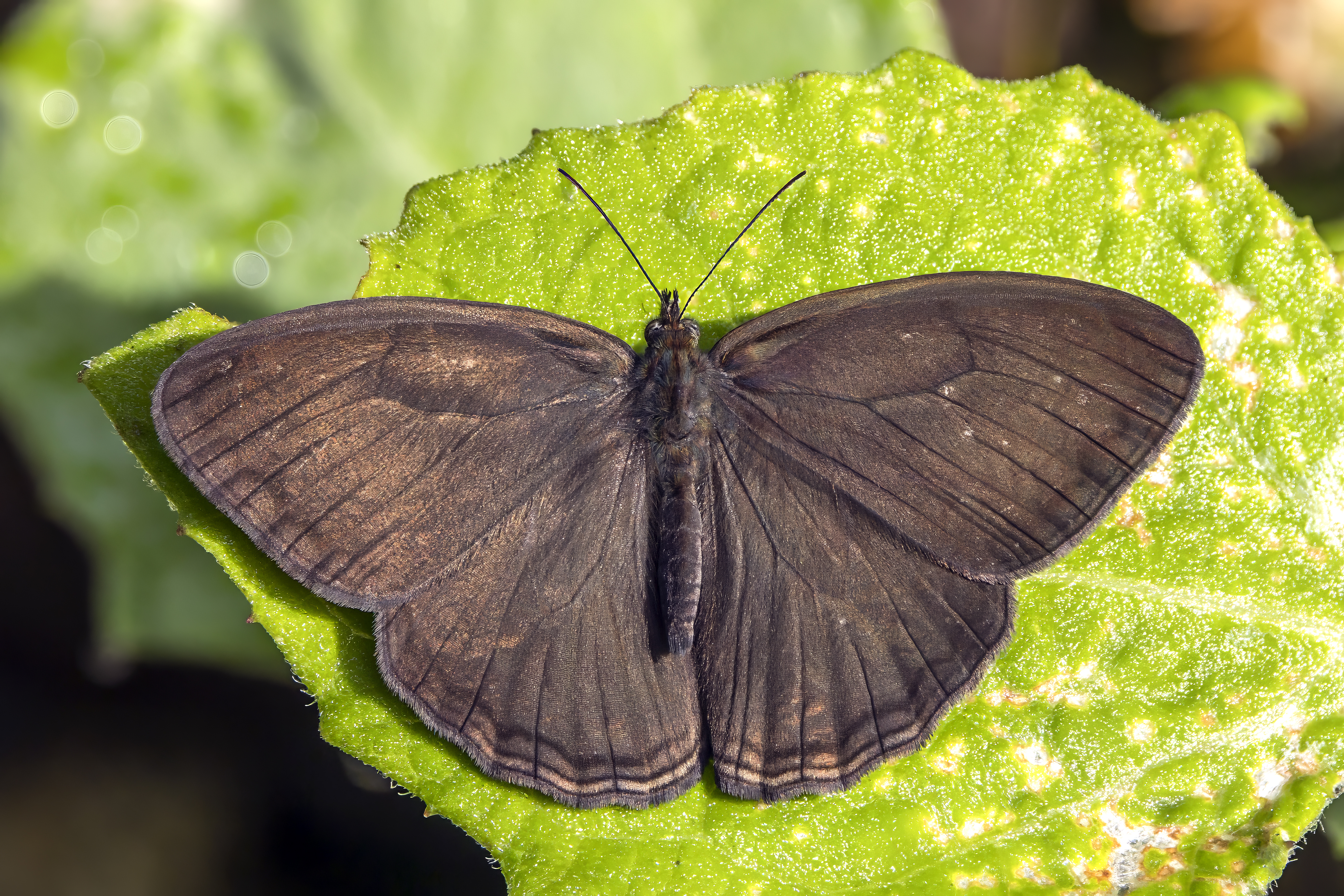
- H. hermes
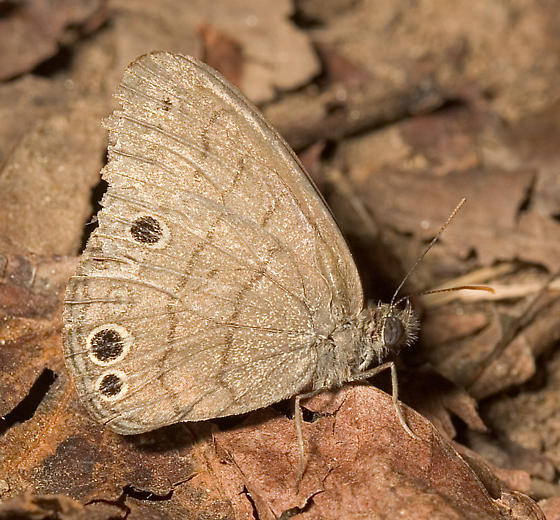
- H. sosybius

Scientific classification
- Kingdom: Animalia
- Phylum: Arthropoda
- Class: Insecta
- Order: Lepidoptera
- Family: Nymphalidae
- Subfamily: Satyrinae
- Tribe: Satyrini
- Subtribe: Euptychiina
- Genus: Hermeuptychia; Forster, 1964

= Hermeuptychia =

Genus of butterflies

Hermeuptychia is a genus of satyrid butterflies found in the Neotropical realm. They are a widespread, cryptic genus, with Cytochrome c oxidase subunit I species delineation methods implying much greater species diversity than currently recognised.

== Species ==
The genus contains the following species, listed alphabetically:

- Hermeuptychia atalanta (Butler, 1867)
- Hermeuptychia cucullina (Weymer, 1911)
- Hermeuptychia fallax (C. & R. Felder, 1862)
- Hermeuptychia gisella (Hayward, 1957)
- Hermeuptychia harmonia (Butler, 1867)
- Hermeuptychia hermes (Fabricius, 1775)
- Hermeuptychia hermybius Grishin, 2014
- Hermeuptychia intricata Grishin, 2014
- Hermeuptychia maimoune (Butler, 1870)
- Hermeuptychia pimpla (C. & R. Felder, 1862)
- Hermeuptychia sosybius (Fabricius, 1793)
