= Hermeuptychia cucullina =

Scientific classification
- Kingdom: Animalia
- Phylum: Arthropoda
- Class: Insecta
- Order: Lepidoptera
- Family: Nymphalidae
- Genus: Hermeuptychia
- Species: H. cucullina

Binomial name
- Hermeuptychia cucullina (Weymer, 1911)

Synonyms
- Euptychia cucullina Weymer, 1911; Euptychia gisella Hayward, 1957

Species of butterfly

Hermeuptychia cucullina is a species of butterfly in the family Nymphalidae. It was described by Gustav Weymer in 1911. It is found in Bolivia.
