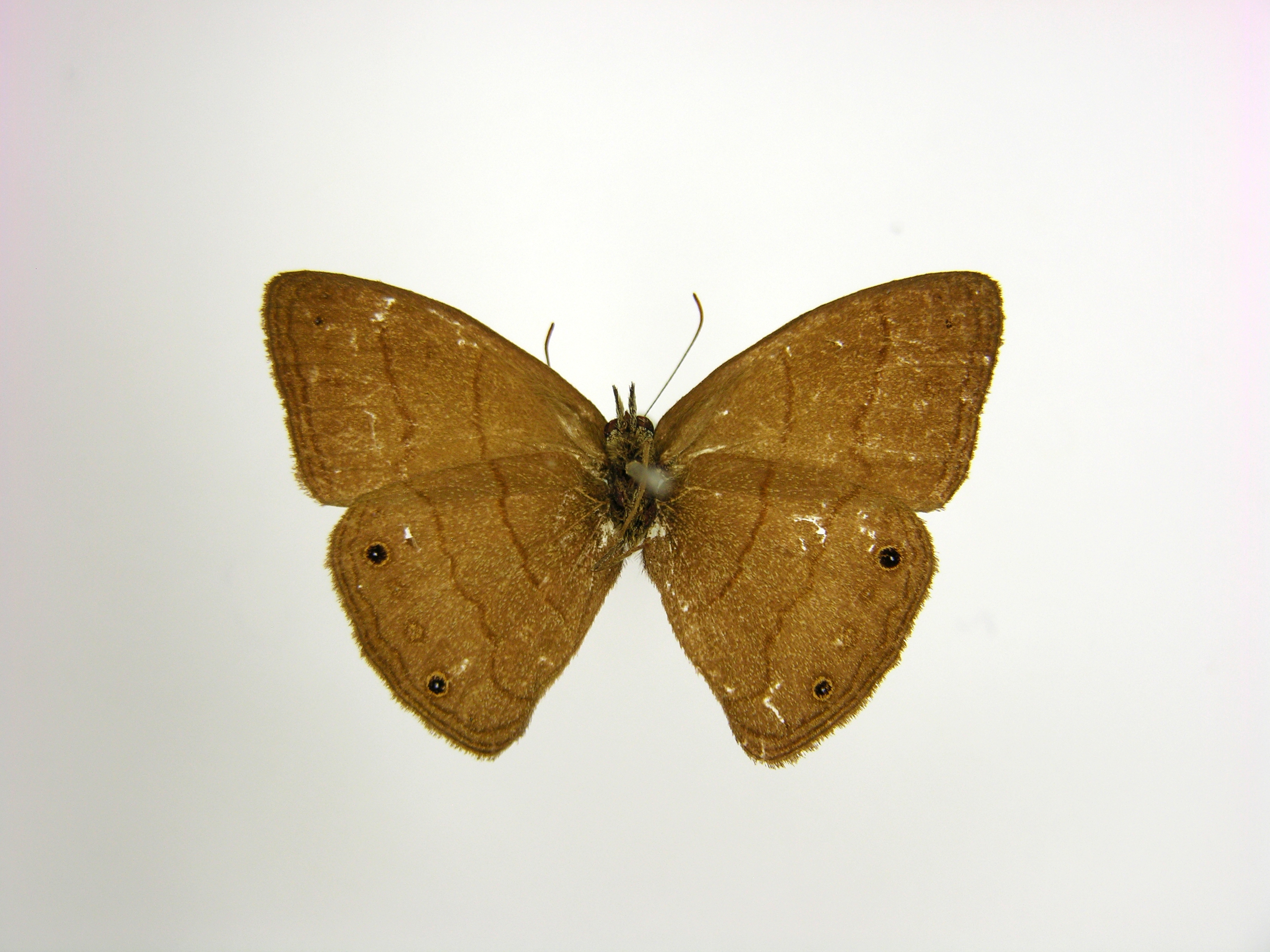

Scientific classification
- Kingdom: Animalia
- Phylum: Arthropoda
- Class: Insecta
- Order: Lepidoptera
- Family: Nymphalidae
- Genus: Hermeuptychia
- Species: H. atalanta

Binomial name
- Hermeuptychia atalanta (Butler, 1867)

Synonyms
- Euptychia atalanta Butler, 1867

= Hermeuptychia atalanta =

Species of butterfly

Hermeuptychia atalanta is a species of butterfly in the family Nymphalidae. It was described by Arthur Gardiner Butler in 1867. It is found in Venezuela.
