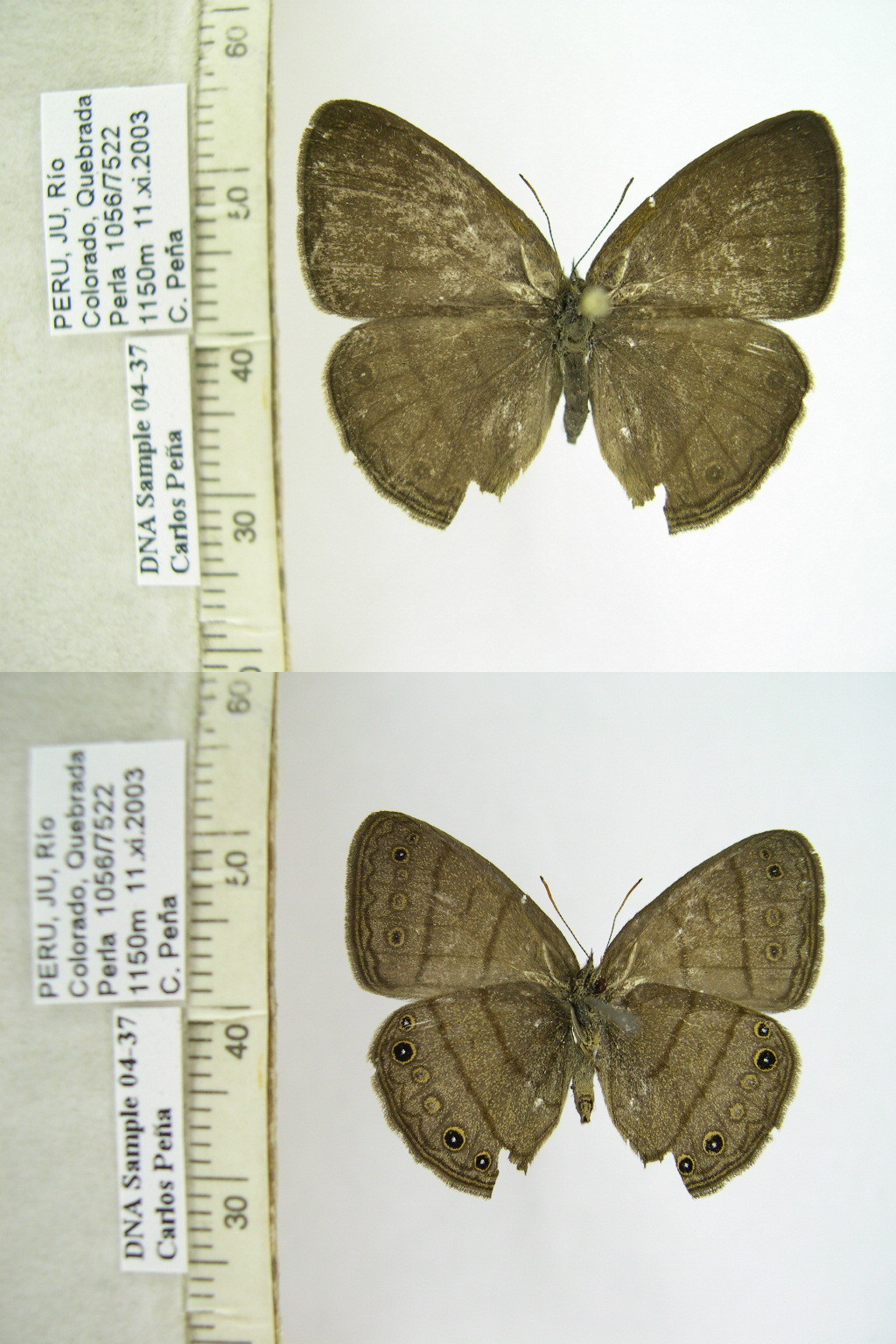
- Hermeuptychia maimoune

Scientific classification
- Kingdom: Animalia
- Phylum: Arthropoda
- Class: Insecta
- Order: Lepidoptera
- Family: Nymphalidae
- Genus: Hermeuptychia
- Species: H. maimoune

Binomial name
- Hermeuptychia maimoune (Butler, 1870)

Synonyms
- Euptychia maimoune Butler, 1870

= Hermeuptychia maimoune =

Species of butterfly

Hermeuptychia maimoune is a species of butterfly in the family Nymphalidae. It was described by Arthur Gardiner Butler in 1870. It is found in Peru.
