= Hermeuptychia pimpla =

Scientific classification
- Kingdom: Animalia
- Phylum: Arthropoda
- Class: Insecta
- Order: Lepidoptera
- Family: Nymphalidae
- Genus: Hermeuptychia
- Species: H. pimpla

Binomial name
- Hermeuptychia pimpla (C. & R. Felder, 1862)

Synonyms
- Neonympha pimpla C. & R. Felder, 1862

Species of butterfly

Hermeuptychia pimpla is a species of butterfly in the family Nymphalidae. It was described by Baron Cajetan von Felder and his son Rudolf Felder in 1862. It is found in Peru.
