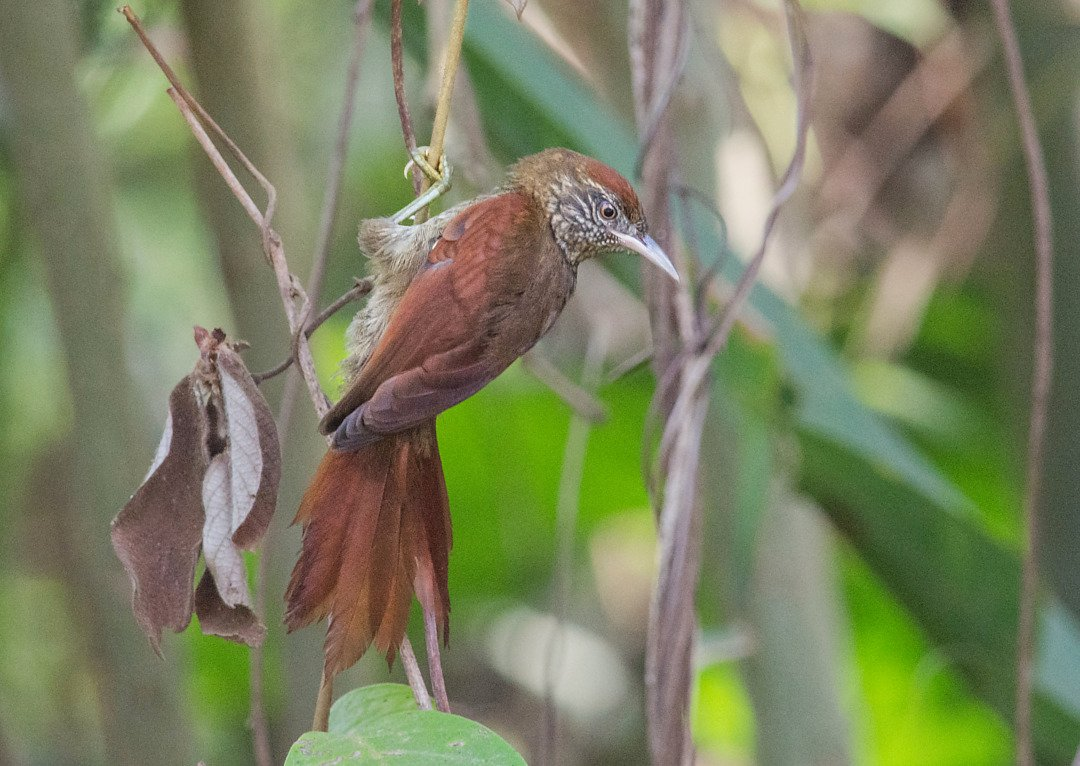

Conservation status
- Least Concern (IUCN 3.1)

Scientific classification
- Kingdom: Animalia
- Phylum: Chordata
- Class: Aves
- Order: Passeriformes
- Family: Furnariidae
- Genus: Cranioleuca
- Species: C. muelleri

Binomial name
- Cranioleuca muelleri (Hellmayr, 1911)

= Scaled spinetail =

Species of bird in Brazil

The scaled spinetail (Cranioleuca muelleri) is a species of bird in the family Furnariidae. It is endemic to the lower Amazon River in Brazil, where it inhabits várzea forests and tropical or subtropical swamplands.

== Description ==
The scaled spinetail is a dark bird with scaly-looking undersides, a pale supercilium, dark brown upperparts and rufuous crown, wings and tail. The tail is graduated, with basally stiffened rectrices, pointed at tips. Breast and belly are very pale buff-brown; the feathers of throat, breast and belly are edged dark olive, creating a coarse, scaled appearance.

It measures 14–15 cm (5.5–5.9 in) in length.

== Distribution and habitat ==
The scaled spinetail is endemic to the east Amazon River in Brazil, ranging from extreme eastern Amazonas, eastern to southern Amapá and Mexiana Island in Pará.

It inhabits flooded tropical evergreen forest, restricted to the undergrowth and midstory of Brazilian várzea forests (seasonally flooded forests). It ranges from 0–200 m elevation.

== Diet and foraging ==
Its diet consists mainly on arthropods. The species usually forages in pairs, sometimes with mixed-species flocks, searching for insects, which it typically gleans from the bark and riverine debris, from undergrowth to mid-storey. It hitches along small branches. During the flood season, the spinetail remains in the middle of the canopy near the water line, looking for insects floating upstream on rafts of vegetation.

== Conservation status ==
The scaled spinetail has been classified as least concern by the International Union for Conservation of Nature (IUCN). It is a poorly known and apparently uncommon species, and the population is likely to be relatively small. Based on a model of future deforestation in the Amazon basin, this species is expected to lose about half of its available habitat over three generations.

The primary threat to this species is accelerating deforestation in the Amazon basin as land is cleared for cattle ranching and soy production, facilitated by expansion of the road network; it is thought likely to be particularly susceptible to fragmentation and edge effects.
