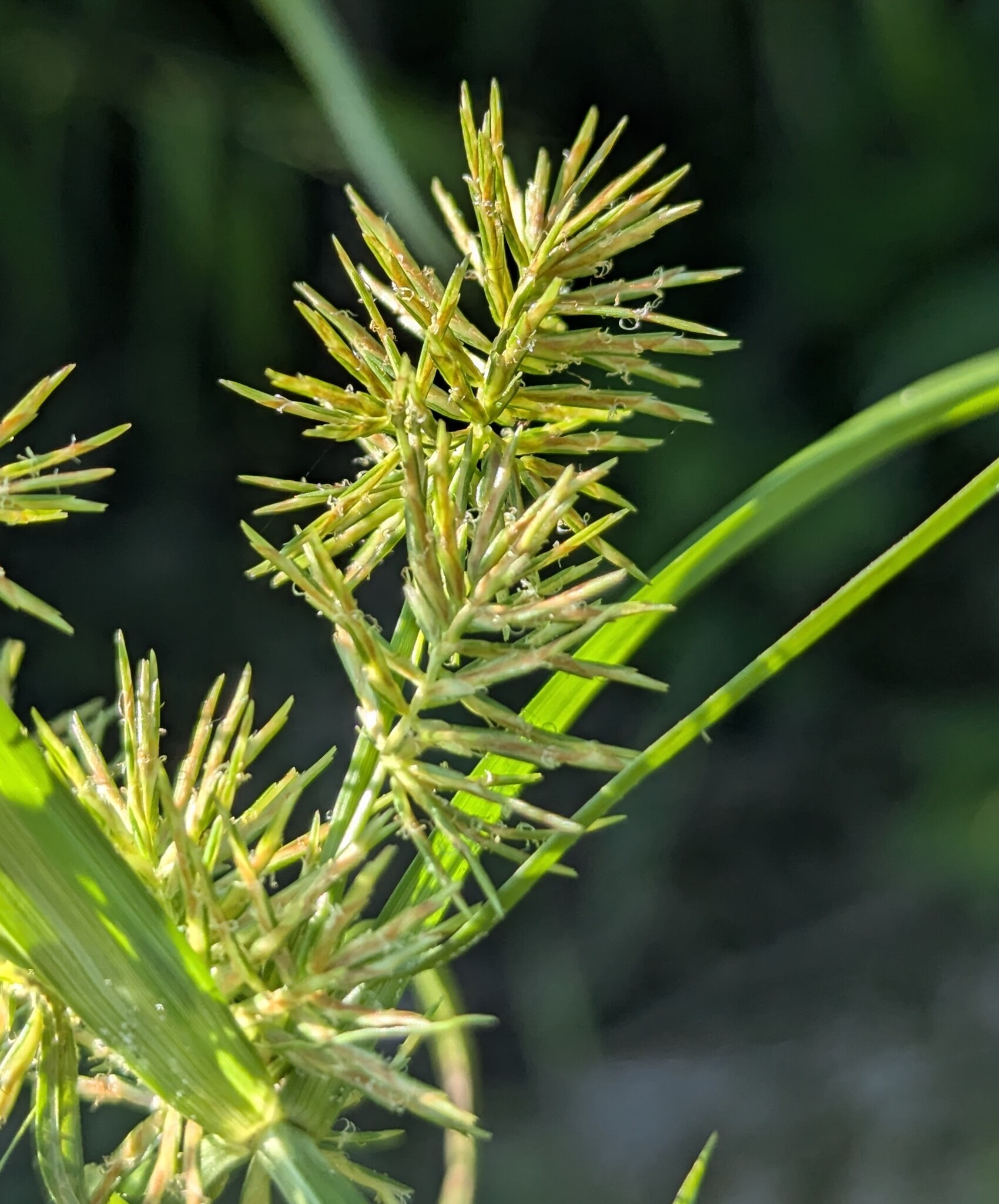
- Brome-Missisquoi, Québec, Canada (2 Sept)

Scientific classification
- Kingdom: Plantae
- Clade: Tracheophytes
- Clade: Angiosperms
- Clade: Monocots
- Clade: Commelinids
- Order: Poales
- Family: Cyperaceae
- Genus: Cyperus
- Species: C. engelmannii

Binomial name
- Cyperus engelmannii Steud.

Synonyms
- Homotypic synonyms: Cyperus ferax var. engelmannii (Steud.) Kük. ex Osten; Cyperus ferax subsp. engelmannii (Steud.) Kük.; Cyperus odoratus var. engelmannii (Steud.) R.Carter, S.D.Jones & Wipff; Heterotypic synonyms: Cyperus tenuior Engelm.

= Cyperus engelmannii =

Species of flowering plant

Cyperus engelmannii, commonly known as Engelmann's flatsedge, is a species of flowering plant in the sedge family Cyperaceae. It is native to North America but the full extent of its range is not well understood. The name honors the German-American botanist George Engelmann who collected its type specimen near St. Louis in 1845. It is similar in appearance to Cyperus odoratus and the name is considered by some to be a synonym for the latter.

== Description ==
Cyperus engelmannii is an annual sedge that stands 10–50 cm (4–20 in) tall. It has a few narrow leaves at the base of the plant, each leaf up to 30 cm (12 in) long. The inflorescence consists of several cylindrical spikes, each resembling a bottle brush. Typically there are several leaf-like bracts at the base of the inflorescence. Each spike bears dozens of spikelets arranged bottle-brush fashion along its axis. Each spikelet, only slightly flattened and nearly cylindrical, supports up to 20 flowers arranged in two vertical rows along the floral axis (called the rachilla). Each of the small, inconspicuous flowers is subtended by a scale (a kind of bract). The fruit is a three-sided achene.

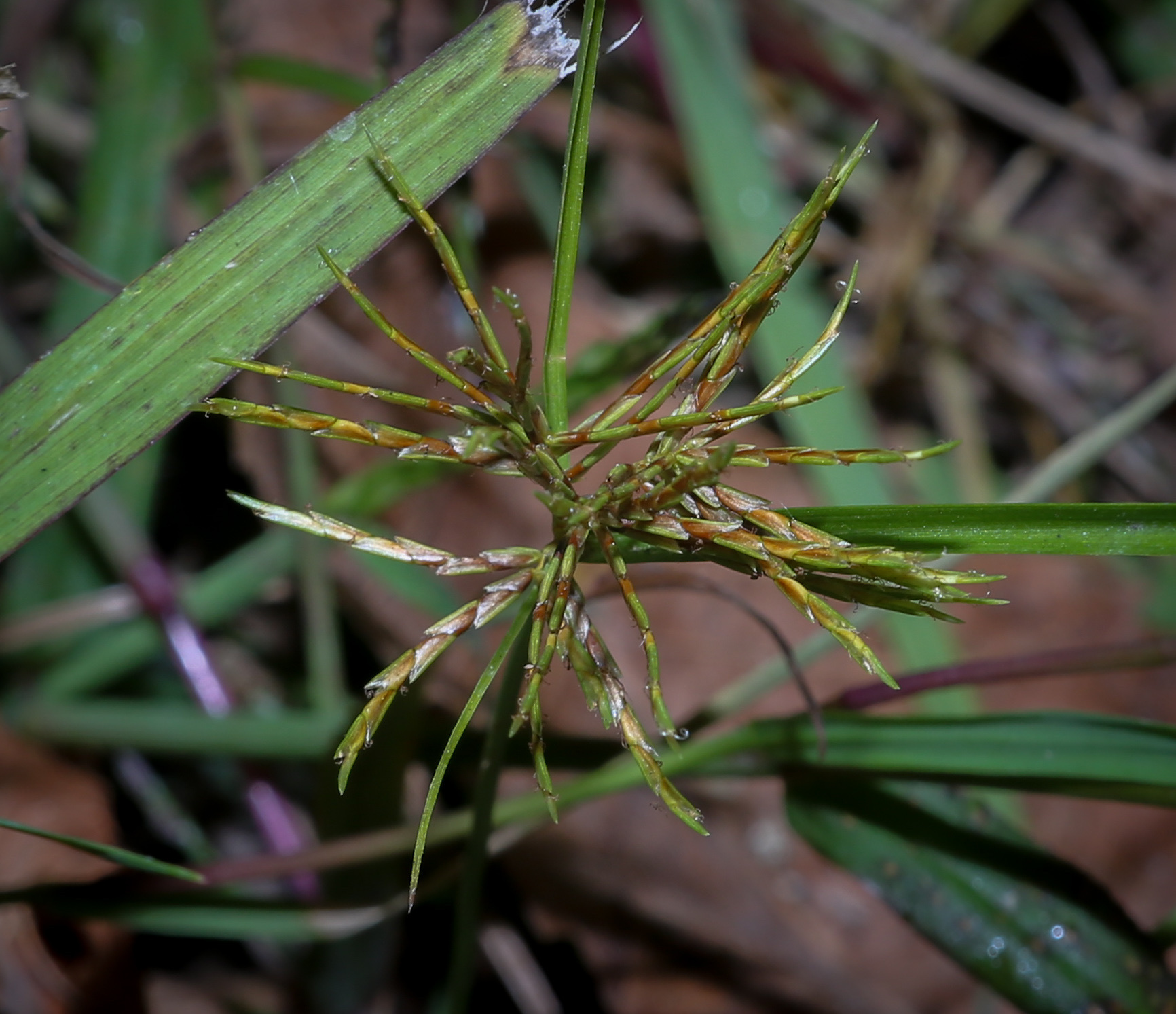
With floral scales that do not overlap

Cyperus engelmannii is similar to Cyperus odoratus. At maturity, the floral scales of Cyperus engelmannii do not overlap, that is, the tip of each scale does not reach the base of the next scale on the same side of the spikelet. In contrast, the floral scales of Cyperus odoratus are overlapping throughout the season. The mature achenes of Cyperus engelmannii are narrow with linear (parallel) edges, while those of Cyperus odoratus are slightly ellipsoid. The widths of fully developed achenes are 0.3–0.4 mm and 0.5–0.7 mm, respectively.

Cyperus engelmannii and Cyperus odoratus are the only two Cyperus species in temperate North America with spikelets that eventually break into one-seeded segments. At maturity, each spikelet breaks into segments each consisting of a scale and an achene held together by a portion of the rachilla.

== Taxonomy ==
Cyperus engelmannii was named and described by the German physician Ernst Gottlieb von Steudel in 1854. The specific epithet engelmannii honors the German-American botanist George Engelmann who collected its type specimen at Cahokia, near St. Louis, in 1845. As of November 2025, the name Cyperus engelmannii Steud. is widely recognized, but some authorities consider it to be a synonym of Cyperus odoratus L.

Cyperus odoratus var. engelmannii was named and described by Carter et al. in 1996. Most authorities consider Cyperus odoratus var. engelmannii (Steud.) R.Carter, S.D.Jones & Wipff to be a homotypic synonym of Cyperus engelmannii Steud., but some accept the variety, not the species.

Cyperus engelmannii is a member of Cyperus subgen. Diclidium (Schrad. ex Nees) C.B.Clarke. It is one of two species in subgenus Diclidium whose range extends into temperate North America (the other being Cyperus odoratus).

== Distribution and habitat ==
Cyperus engelmannii is native to North America. In the United States, it ranges from Massachusetts to Minnesota, southward to Virginia and Missouri, but the full extent of its range in North America is not known. As of November 2025, it is reported from the following provinces and states:

- Canada: Ontario, Quebec
- United States: Delaware, Indiana, Massachusetts, Michigan, Minnesota, New Jersey, New York, North Carolina, Pennsylvania, Vermont, Virginia

In 1995, it was reported from Kentucky, Missouri, Ohio, Pennsylvania, and Tennessee, but as of November 2025, its distribution in the southeastern United States is poorly known.

== Conservation ==
As of October 2025, Cyperus engelmannii is a threatened species of greatest conservation need in Massachusetts. It is imperiled (S2) in Massachusetts and New Jersey, imperiled to vulnerable (S2S3) in Vermont, and vulnerable (S3) in Delaware. It is classified as a rare plant by the state of Pennsylvania.

== See also ==
- List of Cyperus species
- Glossary of botanical terms

== Bibliography ==
- Mears, Randy L.; Libby, Gary W. (March 1995). "New Records of Cyperus (Cyperaceae) from Kentucky". Castanea. 60 (1): 79–82. JSTOR 4033838.
- Naczi, R.F.C. (2017). "Portion of Cyperaceae, the sedge family: Cyperus". In Naczi, R.F.C.; Abbott, J.R.; and collaborators (eds.). New Manual of Vascular Plants of Northeastern United States and Adjacent Canada, compiled in 2016, 2017. Bronx, NY: New York Botanical Garden Press. doi:10.21135/893275471.067. ISBN 978-0-89327-547-1.
- Standley, Lisa A. (2025). "Cyperus engelmannii in New England". Rhodora. 126 (1006): 178–182. Bibcode:2025Rhodo.126.2508S. doi:10.3119/25-08.
- Tucker, Gordon C.; Gandhi, Kanchi N. (2019). "Nomenclatural notes on Cyperus odoratus and related species (Cyperaceae)". Harvard Papers in Botany. 24 (2): 349–357. doi:10.3100/hpib.v24iss2.2019.n18. ISSN 1938-2944.
