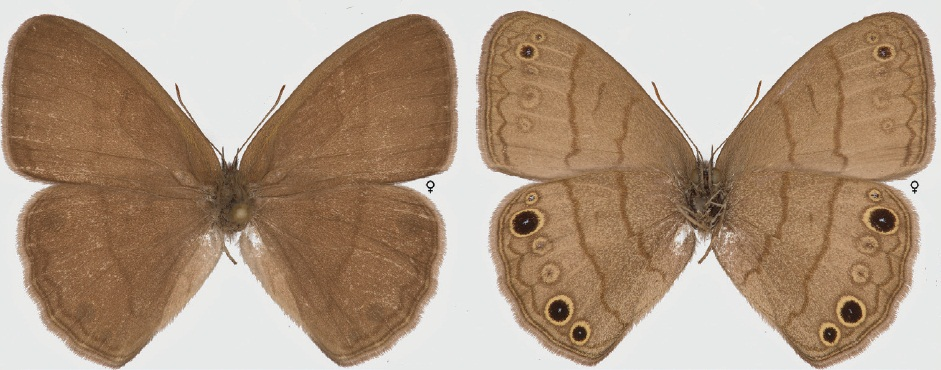
- Female
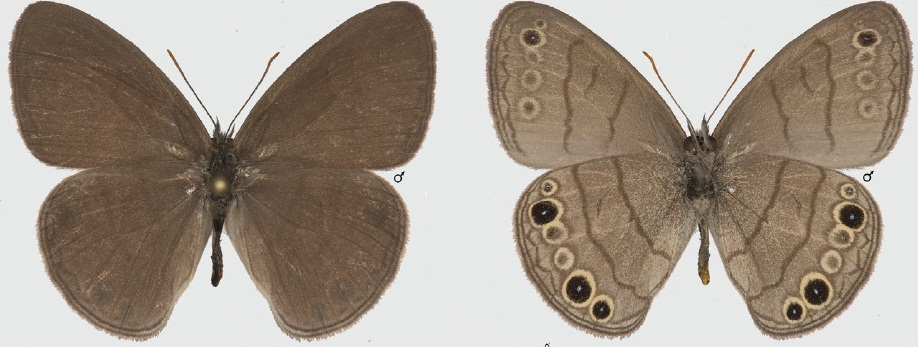
- Male

Scientific classification
- Kingdom: Animalia
- Phylum: Arthropoda
- Class: Insecta
- Order: Lepidoptera
- Family: Nymphalidae
- Genus: Hermeuptychia
- Species: H. intricata

Binomial name
- Hermeuptychia intricata Grishin, 2014

= Hermeuptychia intricata =

Species of butterfly

Hermeuptychia intricata, the intricate satyr is a butterfly of the family Nymphalidae. It has been recorded from the coastal plains of the eastern United States and is currently documented from Texas, Louisiana, Florida, South Carolina, and North Carolina.

The length of the forewings is 16.5 mm.
