= Huratoxin =

Potent daphnane-type diterpenoid

Names
- IUPAC name (1R,2R,6S,7S,8R,10S,11S,12R,14S,16R,18R)-6,7-dihydroxy-8-(hydroxymethyl)-4,18-dimethyl-16-prop-1-en-2-yl-14-[(1E,3E)-trideca-1,3-dienyl]-9,13,15,19-tetraoxahexacyclo[12.4.1.0^{1,11}.0^{2,6}.0^{8,10}.0^{12,16}]nonadec-3-en-5-one

Identifiers
CAS Number	33465-16-6
3D model (JSmol)	Interactive image
PubChem CID	6440991
UNII	GXV3CR7BC8
CompTox Dashboard (EPA)	DTXSID601318664
- InChI: InChI=1S/C34H48O8/c1-6-7-8-9-10-11-12-13-14-15-16-17-32-40-27-25-28-31(20-35,39-28)29(37)33(38)24(18-22(4)26(33)36)34(25,42-32)23(5)19-30(27,41-32)21(2)3/h14-18,23-25,27-29,35,37-38H,2,6-13,19-20H2,1,3-5H3/b15-14+,17-16+/t23-,24-,25-,27-,28+,29-,30-,31+,32-,33-,34+/m1/s1 Key: VWGORPXMXKBHER-PAAMMUKASA-N
- SMILES: C=C(C)[C@]12C[C@@H](C)[C@@]34O[C@](/C=C/C=C/CCCCCCCCC)(O[C@@H]1[C@@H]3[C@@H]1O[C@]1(CO)[C@@H](O)[C@]1(O)C(=O)C(C)=C[C@H]14)O2

Properties
Chemical formula	C_{34}H_{48}O_{8}
Molar mass	584.750 g·mol^{−1}
- Except where otherwise noted, data are given for materials in their standard state (at 25 °C [77 °F], 100 kPa). Infobox references

Huratoxin is a naturally occurring daphnane-type diterpene found in the sap of Hura crepitans. It is extremely toxic to both land and aquatic life. Ingestion causes symptoms resembling those of Pimelea.

Huratoxin strongly activates protein kinase C, a property that has led it to be studied in the context of cancer treatment.
