= Várzea forest =

Seasonal floodplain forest inundated by whitewater rivers in the Amazon biome

A várzea forest is a seasonal floodplain forest inundated by whitewater rivers that occurs in the Amazon biome. Until the late 1970s, the definition was less clear and várzea was often used for all periodically flooded Amazonian forests.

Although sometimes described as consisting only of forest, várzea also contains more open, seasonally flooded habitats such as grasslands, including floating meadows.

== Description ==
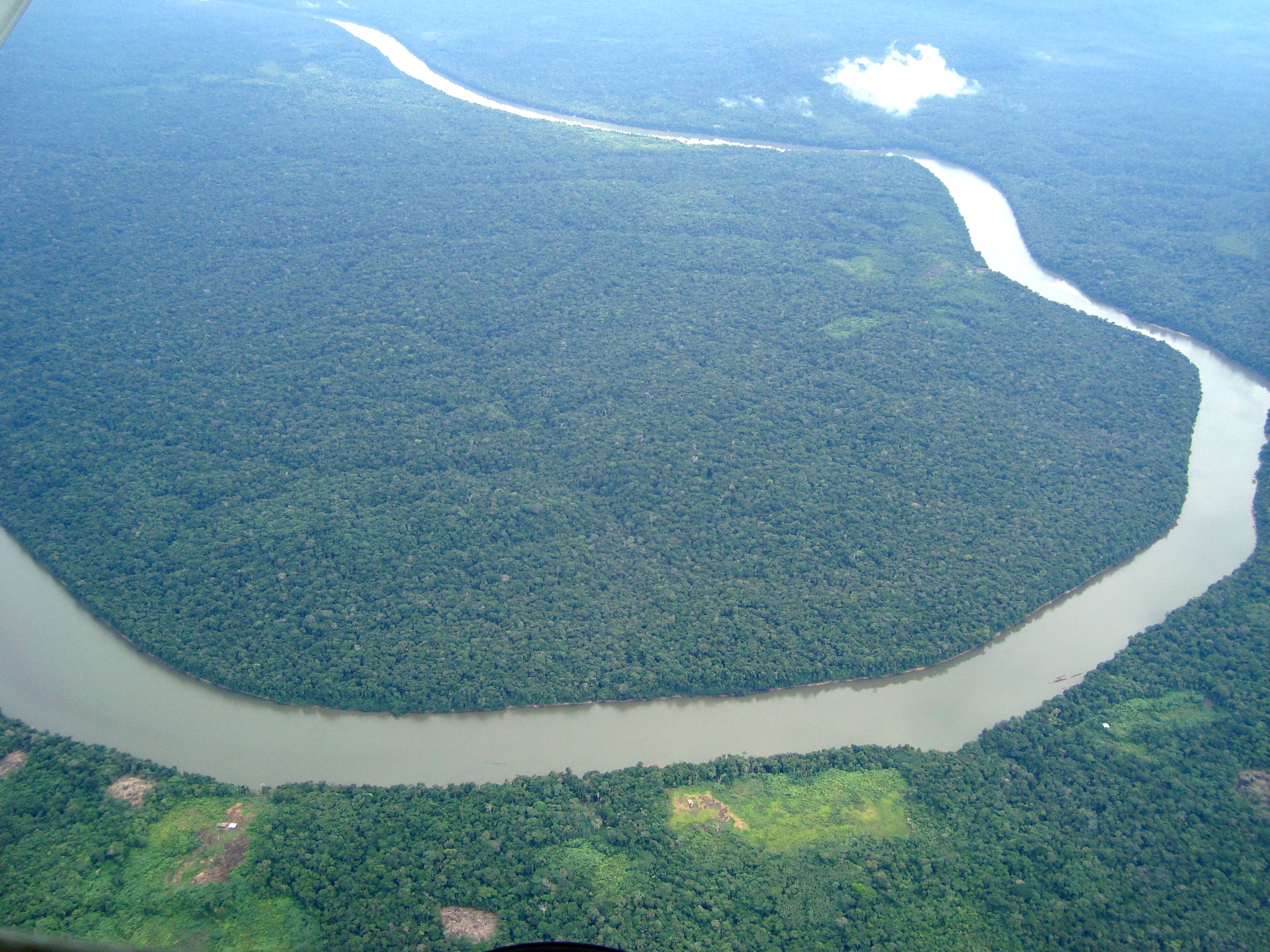
A river in the Amazon

Along the Amazon River and many of its tributaries, high annual rainfall that occurs mostly within a rainy season results in extensive seasonal flooding of areas from stream and river discharge. The result is a 10–15 m (33–49 ft) rise in water level, with nutrient rich waters.

The Iquitos várzea ecoregion covers the margins of the upper Amazon and its tributaries. Further down are the Purus várzea in the middle Amazon, the Monte Alegre várzea and Gurupa várzea on the lower Amazon and the Marajó várzea at the mouth of the Amazon. The Marajó várzea is affected by both freshwater and tidal flows.

Várzea forests can be split into two categories: low várzea and high várzea. Low várzea forests can be categorized by lower lying areas where the annual water column has an average height of more than 3 m (10 ft), where the period of flooding is greater than 50 days per year. High várzea forests are categorized as the areas where the average annual water column is less than 3 m (10 ft) high and flooding periods are less than 50 days per year. Amazonian várzea forests are flooded by nutrient rich, high sediment whitewater rivers such as the Solimões-Amazon, the Purus, and Madeira rivers. This makes the várzea areas distinct from igapós, floodplains from nutrient poor blackwater. The water level fluctuations that the várzea experiences result in distinct aquatic and terrestrial phases within the year. Amazonian white water river floodplains cover an area of more than 300,000 km^{2} (120,000 sq mi), and várzea forests cover approximately 180,000 km^{2} (69,000 sq mi) of the Amazon basin. 68% of the Amazonian river basin is located in Brazil, with the remaining areas located in Bolivia, Colombia, Ecuador, French Guiana, Peru, Suriname, and Guyana. The várzea extends from this basin upward into the land before reaching slopes into the terra firme forests.

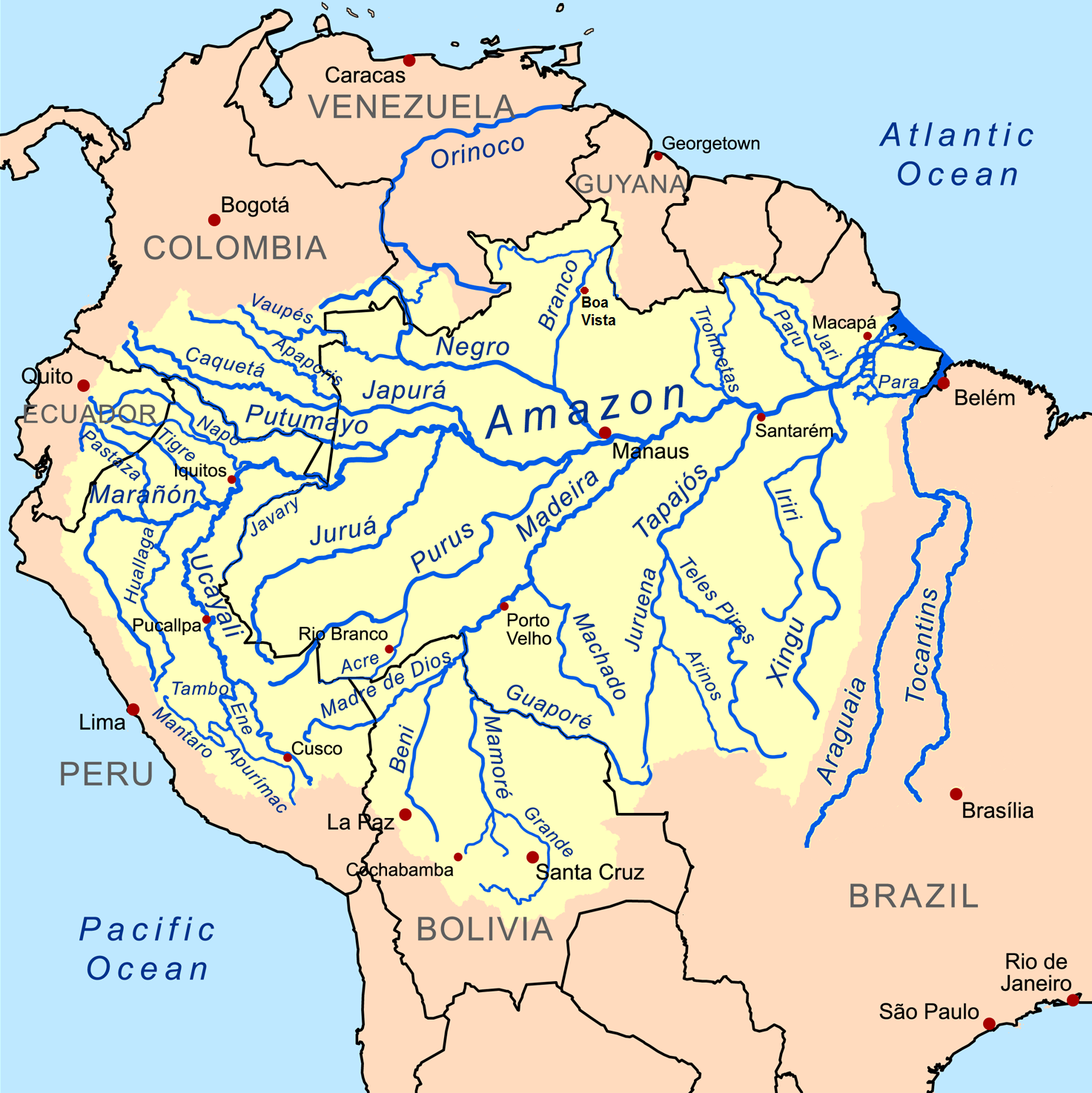
Amazon River Basin

Várzea habitats are generally diverse, consisting of forests, grasslands, lakes, flooded fields, and swamps. Approximately 75% of the várzea areas consist of dense canopy forests, with the other 25% being represented by the remaining habitats. Within the várzea, topographic variation leads to different flooding durations and severity, resulting in vegetation being separated where plants with different tolerances to flooding inhabit different areas.

== Species richness ==
Due to the renewal of soil nutrients caused by the annual white water flooding, várzea forests are some of the most productive areas of Amazonia and serve as important breeding grounds for fish, birds, mammals, and reptiles. In order to grow and survive in this environment, both plants and animals must have a large range of morphological, anatomical, physiological and ethological adaptations. For example, during the flooding season, fish and other aquatic organisms take advantage of the lower density of predators, which have migrated or are confined to smaller, dryer areas, and use this time to reproduce.

Both Amazonian manatees (Trichechus inunguis) and river dolphins (Inia geoffrensis) spend time in várzea areas during high water periods of the flood season. In addition, black caiman (Melanosuchus niger) are abundant and also play an important ecological role. The charismatic jaguar (Panthera onca) is also found in a variety of várzea habitat types.

In the várzea, tree species richness, distribution and vegetation structure are influenced by a variety of characters such as topography and sedimentation dynamics. Leguminosae and Euphorbiaceae are two of the most important and abundant families within both high and low várzea habitats. Due to the cycles of both sedimentation and erosion, habitat types of different successional stages occur simultaneously within limited areas of the várzea. Most species tend to grow in areas that are subjected to the river flood pulse, but not in areas that are influenced by the sea and tides. This results in waterlogged or flooded conditions for up to seven months of the year, and consequently plant species numbers in the várzea are lower than the non-flooded terra firme forests.

== Soils and agriculture ==
Like many tropical environments, in the várzea there is evidence that nitrogen is a limiting factor for primary production; however, nitrogen reaches the floodplain via flooding as dissolved and particulate matter.

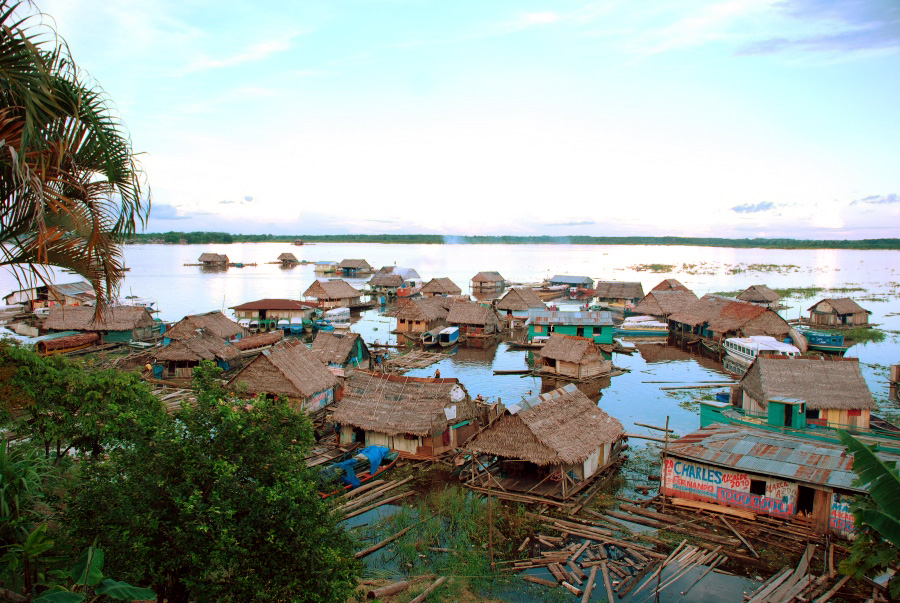
Amazonas floating village, Iquitos

In general, soils of the várzea initially are very fertile from the white water flooding, but after two or three years of cultivation the soil fertility declines. Because of the várzea forests inherent nutrient rich environment and the proximity to rivers, which act as transport routes for local peoples, these areas have historically favored human occupation, resulting in the most densely populated environment of Amazonia. People have been known to plant rice, corn, beans, peppers, and bananas in várzea floodplains bordering rivers. In terms of seed dispersal, local peoples have influenced both the establishment and regeneration of várzea forests by controlling populations of fish, birds, rodents, and other seed dispersers and also by removing natural vegetation to make room for agriculture and cattle. Historically, cattle ranching on natural pasture areas was a principal economic activity in the Amazonian floodplains, an activity that has continued into the present. However, in modern times land is usually cleared for cattle ranching. In some areas, such as the floodplains of Amapá, cattle herds have been traded in favor of water buffalo, which do better in the wetter várzea habitat. Both cattle and water buffalo cause damage to river banks and can lead to extensive soil erosion.

== Human impacts ==
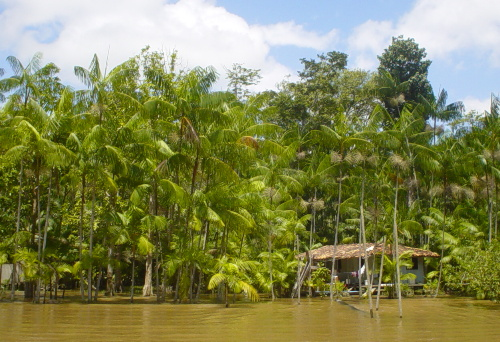
Grove of açaí palms

One of the main impacts people have had on the várzea is deforestation for logging and agricultural purposes. Várzea forests show promise for timber production and forest management within Amazonia because they are less species rich than terra firme forests, but still with great amounts of timber. In addition, due to the fertile alluvial soils within várzea forests, trees typically grow more rapidly in the várzea than within terre firme forests and transport of logs is made easy by the use of the river. Most likely a result of the above reasoning, within Amazonia, logging has traditionally been centered in the várzea, and only in recent years has expanded into terra firme areas. In addition to deforestation of the várzea via logging, landowners may also dig channels to widen or connect streams in várzea areas in order to more easily transport logs or move to new, unexploited areas of the forest, which leads to loss of forest and soil degradation within the várzea habitat. It has been found that from 1976 to 1991 the areal extent of mixed species várzea had a net decrease of 25%, while other types of surrounding habitats, such as palm forest or herbaceous cover, increased. The main impacts associated with the loss of várzea areas were logging, heart of palm extraction, and agricultural conversion.

An additional major impact from humans seen in the várzea is the extraction or mass production of the açaí palm (Euterpe oleracea) for the palm or for the well known açaí berry. The juice obtained from açaí is a major part of the diet for some regional populations within the Amazon and in some regions is the most important monetary crop. In açaí agroforests, other species surrounding clumps of the palm are commonly heavily pruned to remove competition.

People have also had a severe impact on animal populations in the várzea. For example, selective hunting within the várzea of the red howler monkey (Alouatta seniculus) and the tufted capuchin monkey (Cebus apella) has had large effects on the regeneration of fig (Ficus sphenophylla) trees. Both species of monkey are known to be important seed dispersers within the várzea.

== Related literature ==
- Fageria, N.K., A.B. Santos, I.D.G. Lins, and S.L. Camargo (1997). "Characterization of fertility and particle size of várzea soils of Mato Grosso and Mato Grosso do sul states of Brazil". Communications in Soil Science and Plant Analysis. 28 (1): 37–47. Bibcode:1997CSSPA..28...37F. doi:10.1080/00103629709369770.
- Junk, W.J. & M.T.F. Piedade (2004). "Status of knowledge, ongoing research, and research needs in Amazonian wetlands". Wetlands Ecology and Management. 12 (6): 597–609. Bibcode:2004WetEM..12..597J. doi:10.1007/s11273-005-1767-9. S2CID 45692576.
