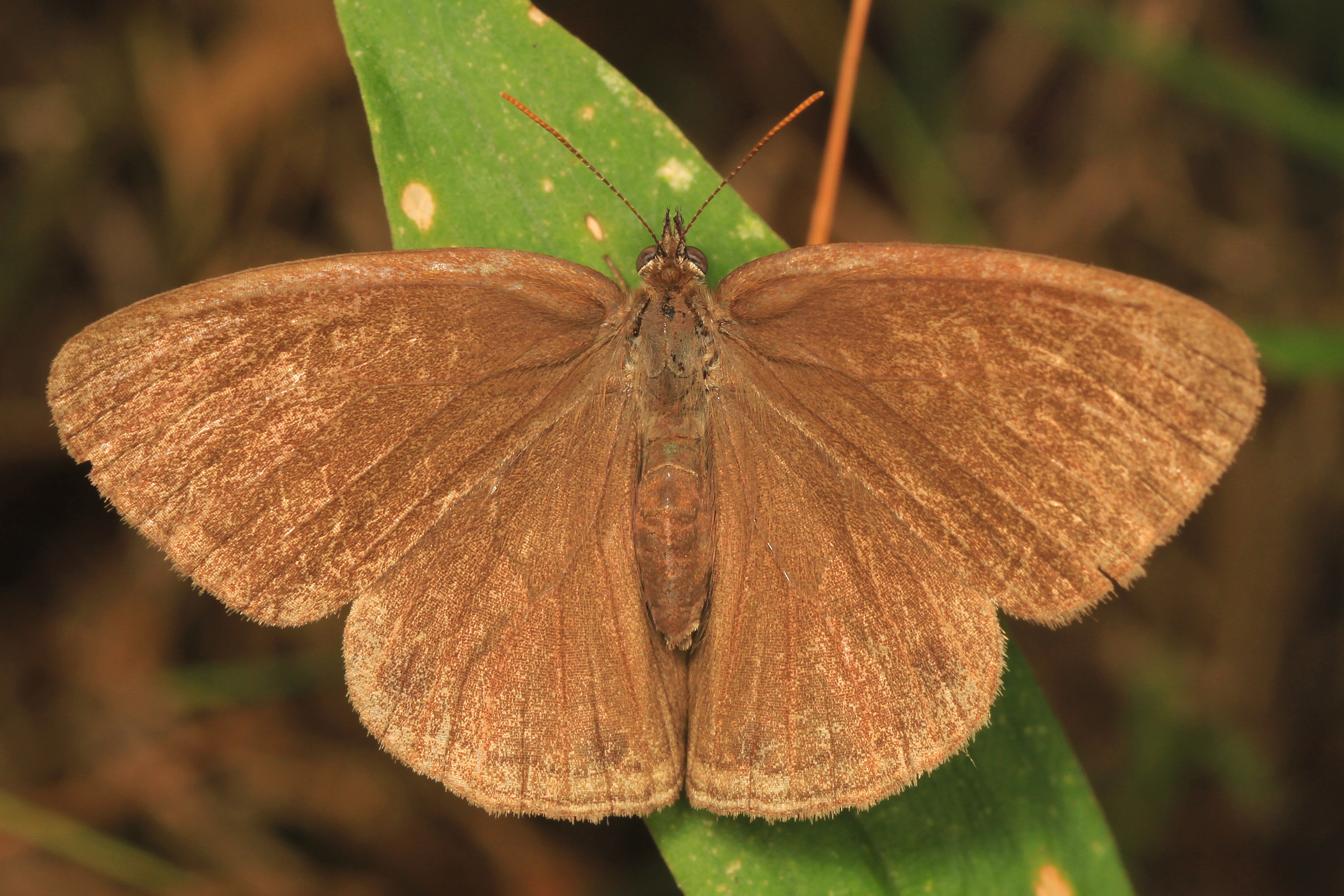
- Mississippi, USA
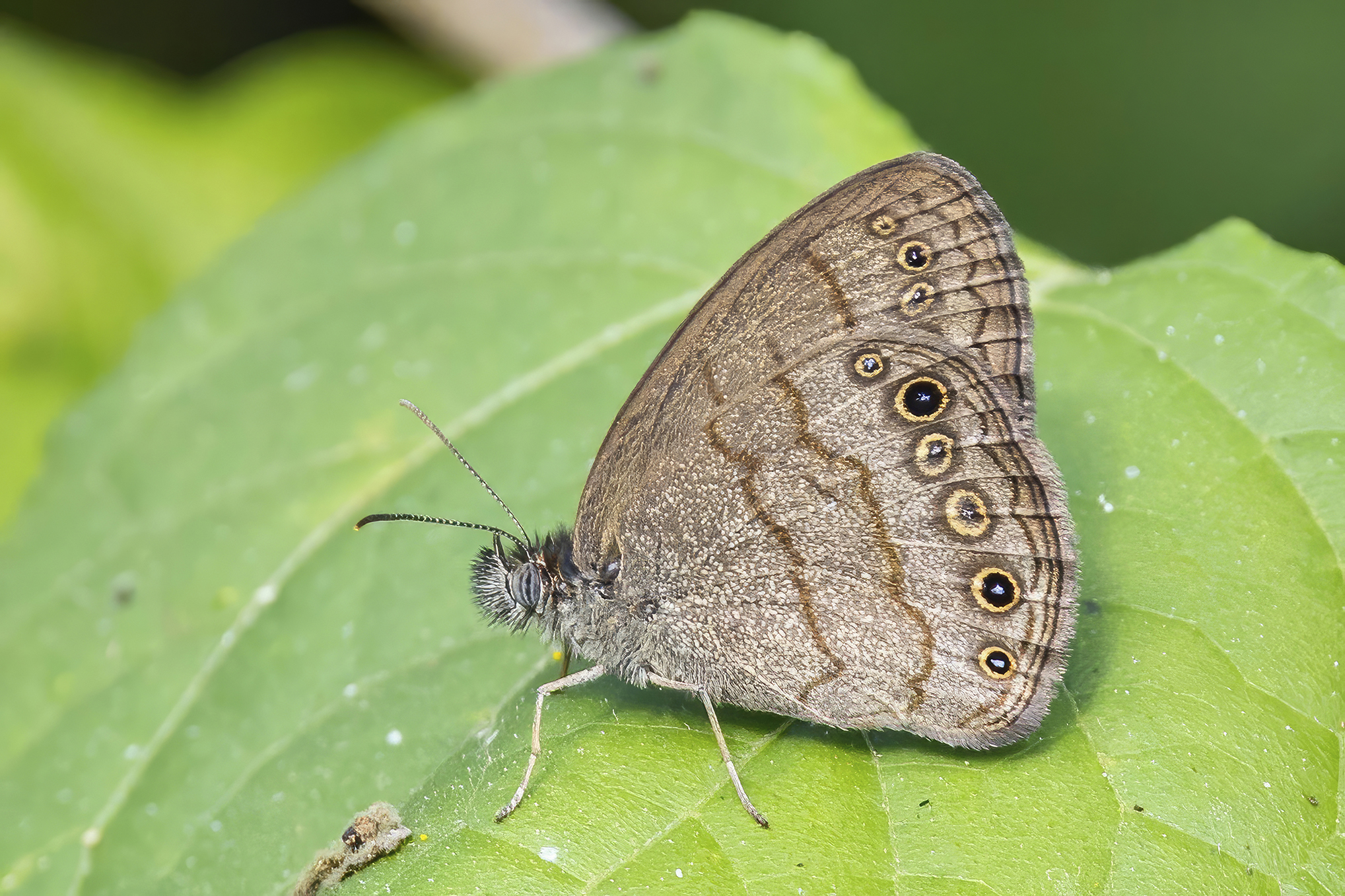
- Copan, Honduras

Conservation status
- Secure (NatureServe)

Scientific classification
- Kingdom: Animalia
- Phylum: Arthropoda
- Class: Insecta
- Order: Lepidoptera
- Family: Nymphalidae
- Genus: Hermeuptychia
- Species: H. sosybius

Binomial name
- Hermeuptychia sosybius (Fabricius, 1793)

Synonyms
- Papilio sosybius Fabricius, 1793; Cissia sosybius; Hermeuptychia hermes kappeli Anken, 1993

= Hermeuptychia sosybius =

Carolina satyr

Species of butterfly

Hermeuptychia sosybius, the Carolina satyr, is a butterfly of the family Nymphalidae. It is found in the United States from southern New Jersey south along the coast to southern Florida, west to south-eastern Kansas, central Oklahoma and central Texas. It is also found in Mexico and Central America.

The wingspan is 32–38 mm.

The larvae also feed on various Poaceae species, including Axonopus compressus, Eremochloa ophiuroides, Stenotaphrum secundatum and Poa pratensis.
