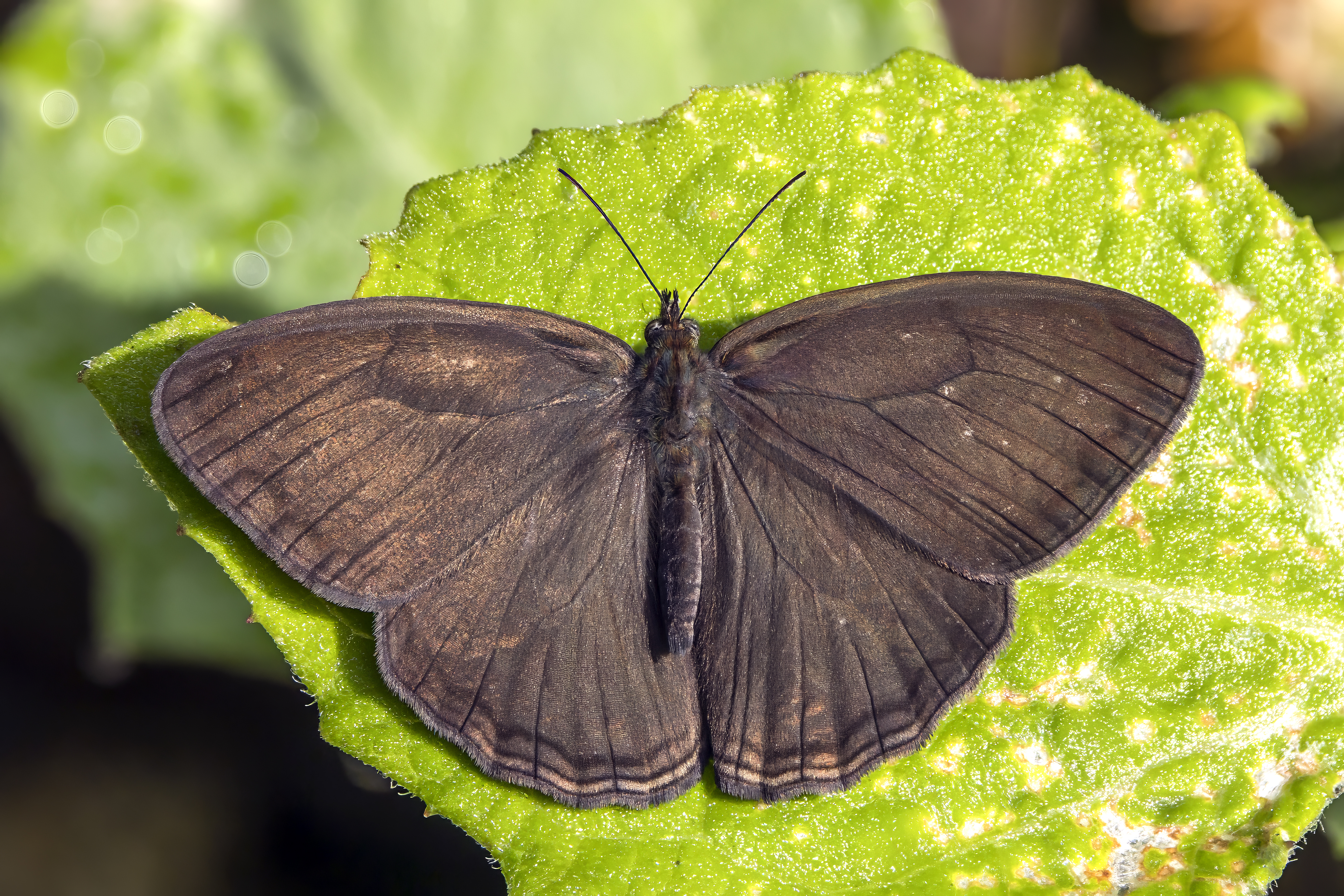

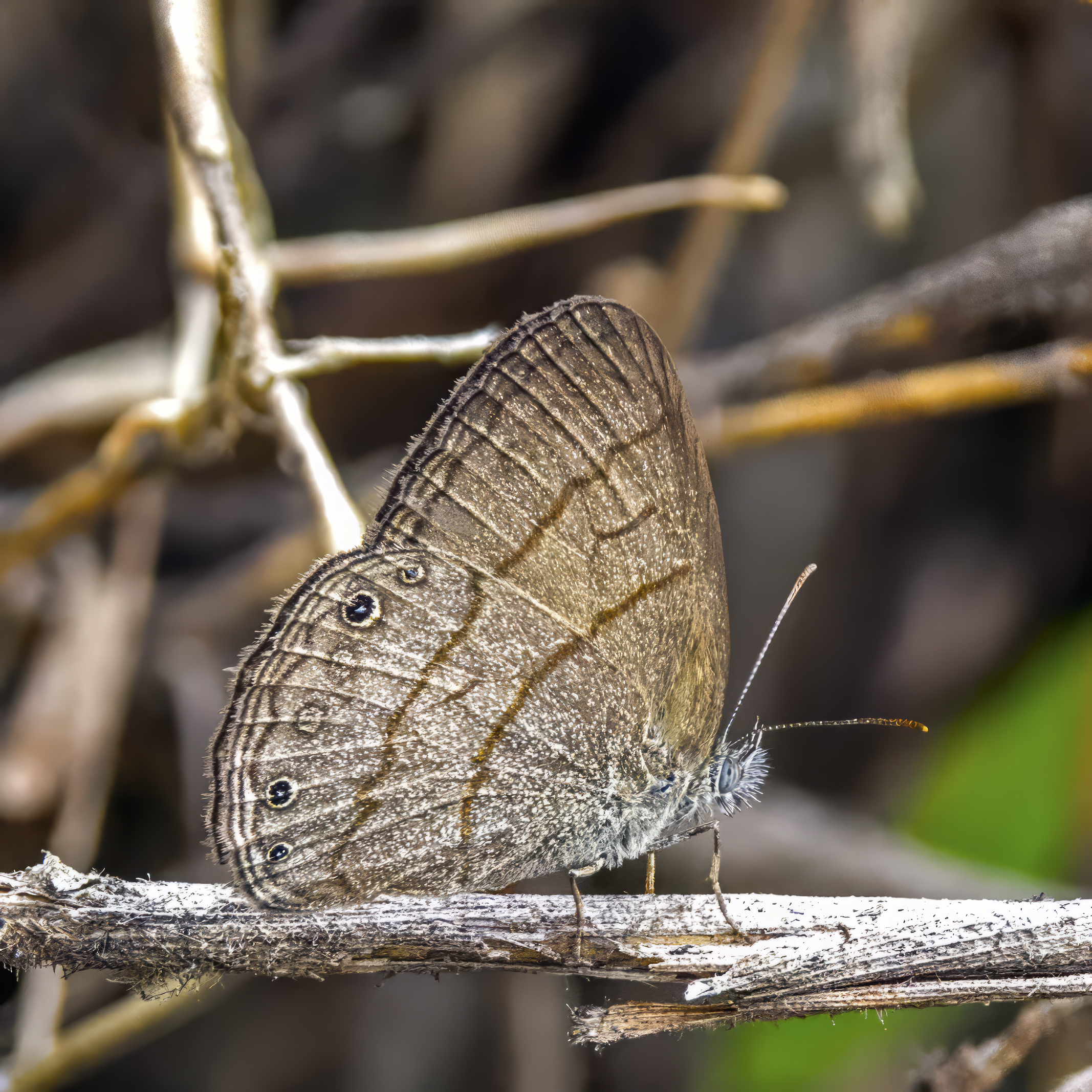
- Both in Colombia

Scientific classification
- Kingdom: Animalia
- Phylum: Arthropoda
- Class: Insecta
- Order: Lepidoptera
- Family: Nymphalidae
- Genus: Hermeuptychia
- Species: H. hermes

Binomial name
- Hermeuptychia hermes (Fabricius, 1775)

Synonyms
- Papilio hermes Fabricius, 1775; Papilio camerta Cramer, [1780]; Oreas canthe Hübner, [1811]; Euptychia hermessa Hübner, [1819]; Euptychia nana Möschler, 1877; Hermeuptychia f. hermesina Forster, 1964; Hermeuptychia hermes isabella Anken, 1994

= Hermeuptychia hermes =

Species of butterfly

Hermeuptychia hermes, the Hermes satyr, is a species of Hermeuptychia butterfly in the family Nymphalidae. It is found from southern Texas through Mexico to Brazil (Rio de Janeiro and Mato Grosso do Sul), Suriname and Bolivia. The habitat consists of forest edges and shaded lawns.

The wingspan is about 31 mm.
