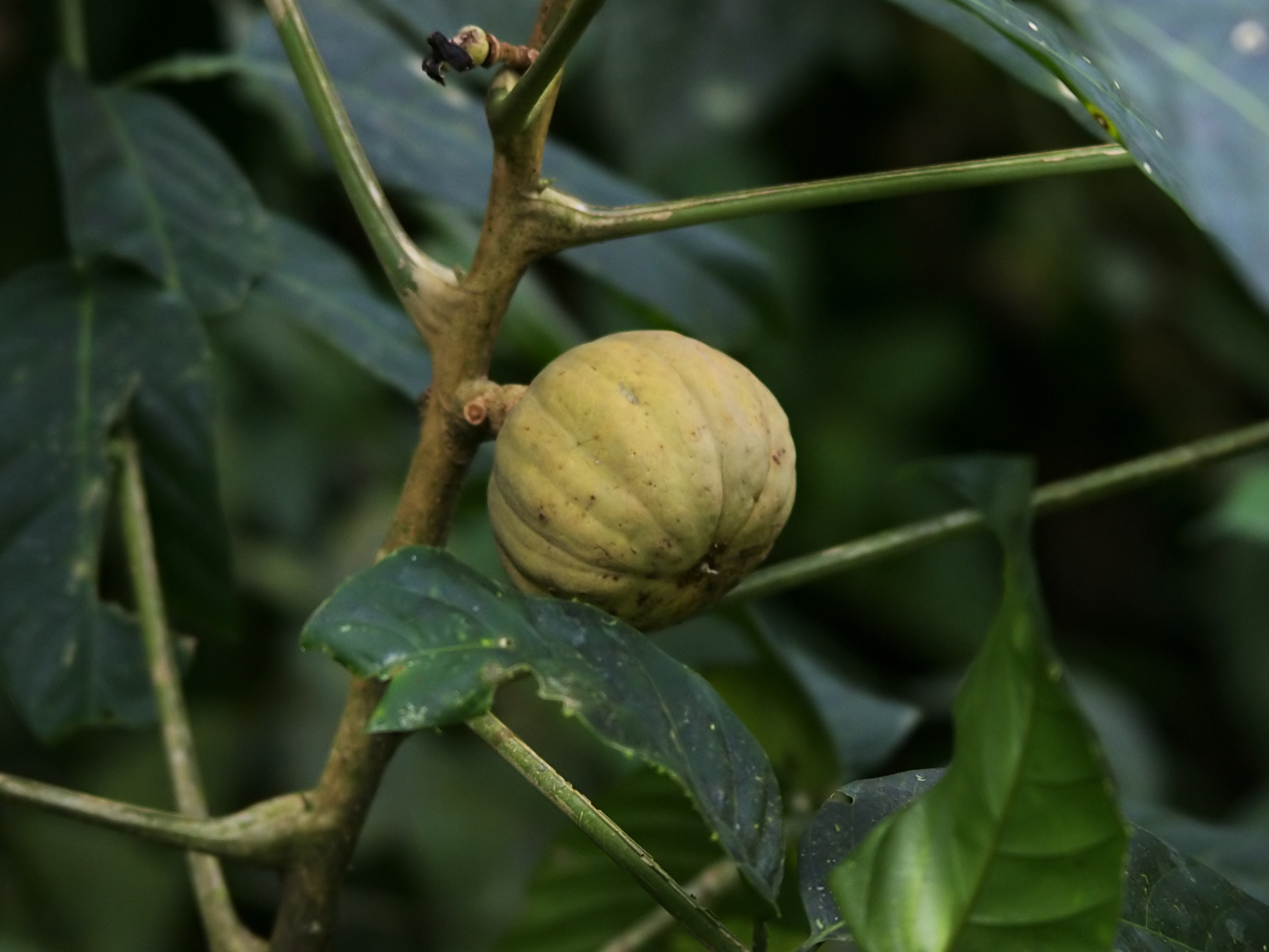

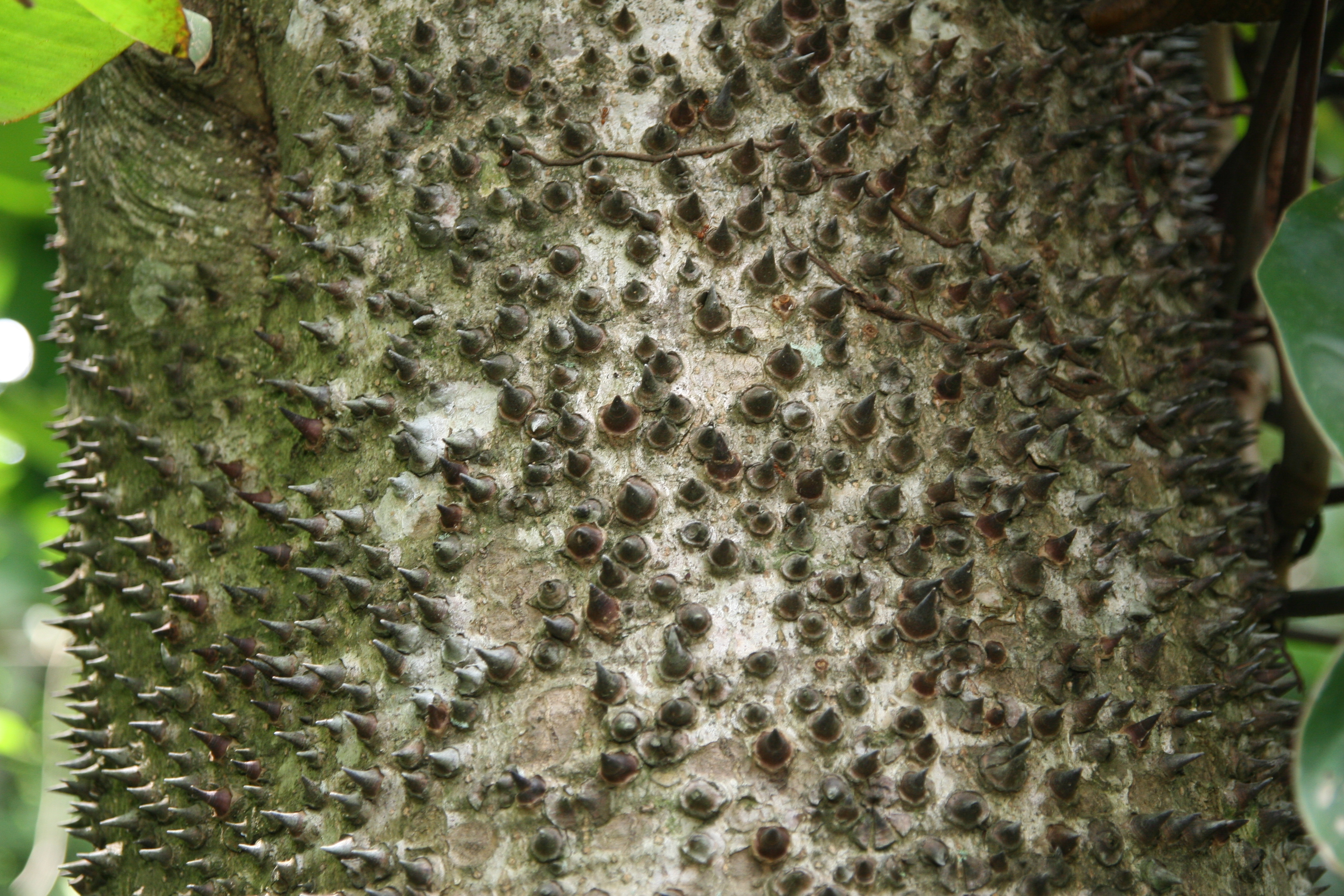

Scientific classification
- Kingdom: Plantae
- Clade: Tracheophytes
- Clade: Angiosperms
- Clade: Eudicots
- Clade: Rosids
- Order: Malpighiales
- Family: Euphorbiaceae
- Genus: Hura
- Species: H. crepitans

Binomial name
- Hura crepitans L.

Synonyms
- Hura brasiliensis Willd.; Hura crepitans var. genuina Müll.Arg.; Hura crepitans var. membranacea Müll.Arg.; Hura crepitans var. oblongifolia Müll.Arg.; Hura crepitans var. orbicularis Müll.Arg.; Hura crepitans var. ovata Müll.Arg.; Hura senegalensis Baill.; Hura strepens Willd.

= Hura crepitans =

Species of plant

Hura crepitans, known by the common names sandbox tree, possumwood, monkey no-climb, assacu (from Tupi asaku), and jabillo, is a species of evergreen tree in the family Euphorbiaceae, native to tropical regions of North and South America including the Amazon rainforest. It is naturalized in parts of Africa with sufficient rainfall. It is also present in parts of Tanzania, where it is considered an invasive species. Because its fruit explodes when ripe, it has also received the colloquial nickname "dynamite tree".

== Description ==
The sandbox tree can grow to 60 metres (200 ft) in height, and up to 13.2 metres (43 ft) in girth at 1.8 m (6 ft) above the ground; its large ovate leaves grow to 60 cm (2 ft) long. The trees are monoecious, with red, un-petaled flowers. Male flowers grow on long spikes, while female flowers grow alone in leaf axils.

The fruit are large, pumpkin-shaped capsules, 3–5 cm (1–2 in) long, 5–8 cm (2–3 in) diameter, with 16 carpels arranged radially. Its seeds are flattened and about 2 cm (3/4 in) diameter. The capsules explode when ripe, splitting into segments and launching seeds at 70 m/s (250 km/h; 160 mph). One source states that ripe capsules catapult their seeds as far as 100 m (330 ft). Another source states that seeds are thrown as far as 45 m (150 ft) from a tree, most commonly 30 m (100 ft). High-speed video analysis of its exploding fruit revealed that sandbox seeds fly with backspin as opposed to topspin, which had been previously assumed. Backspin helps seeds remain oriented to minimize their drag during flight.

The trunk is covered in sharp spikes that grow to more than 1 inch (25 mm) long, and on mature trees may be so thick that the bases of the spines touch. The sap is milky and contains toxins, including huratoxin. It has been traditionally used as a fish poison (piscicide), arrow poison, and in traditional medicine to treat a variety of ailments.

== Uses ==
Its wood is light enough that indigenous people used it to make canoes. Fishermen have been said to use the milky, caustic sap from this tree to poison fish. The Caribs made arrow poison from its sap. In Africa the trees have been planted to provide shade, but demand for the wood for making household goods has resulted in the loss of many trees. The wood is used for furniture under the name "hura". In a time when most writing pens left wet ink on the page, the trees' unripe seed capsules were sawn in half to make decorative boxes (also called pounce pots) to hold the "sand" used to dry the ink, hence the name "sandbox tree".

Extracts from this species have also been documented in herbal remedies. The seeds contain an oil that is toxic if ingested but can be made into biodiesel and soap; the starchy leftovers after extracting the oil from the seeds can be made into animal feed after cooking.

== Gallery ==
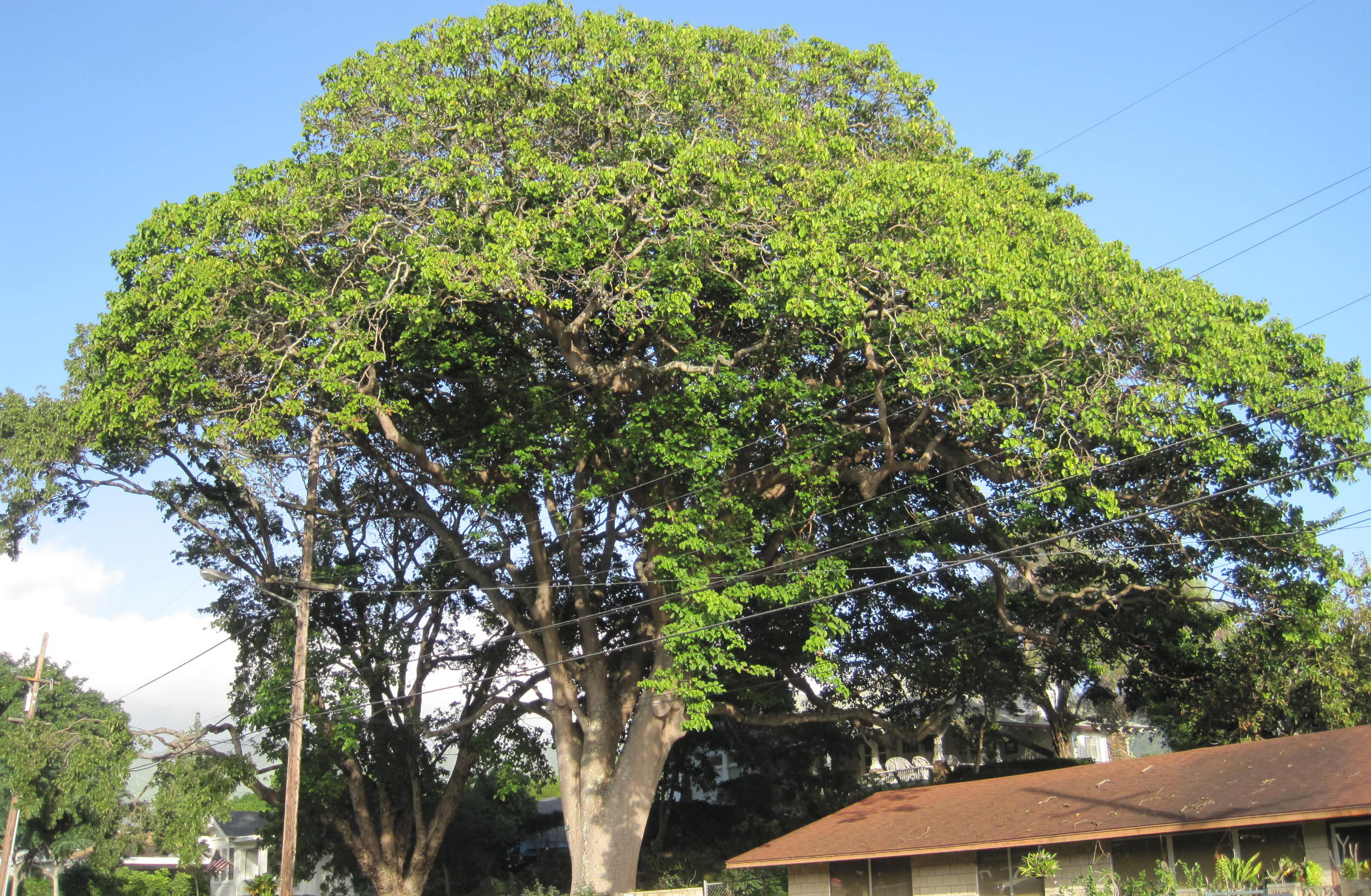
Large sandbox tree in Honolulu

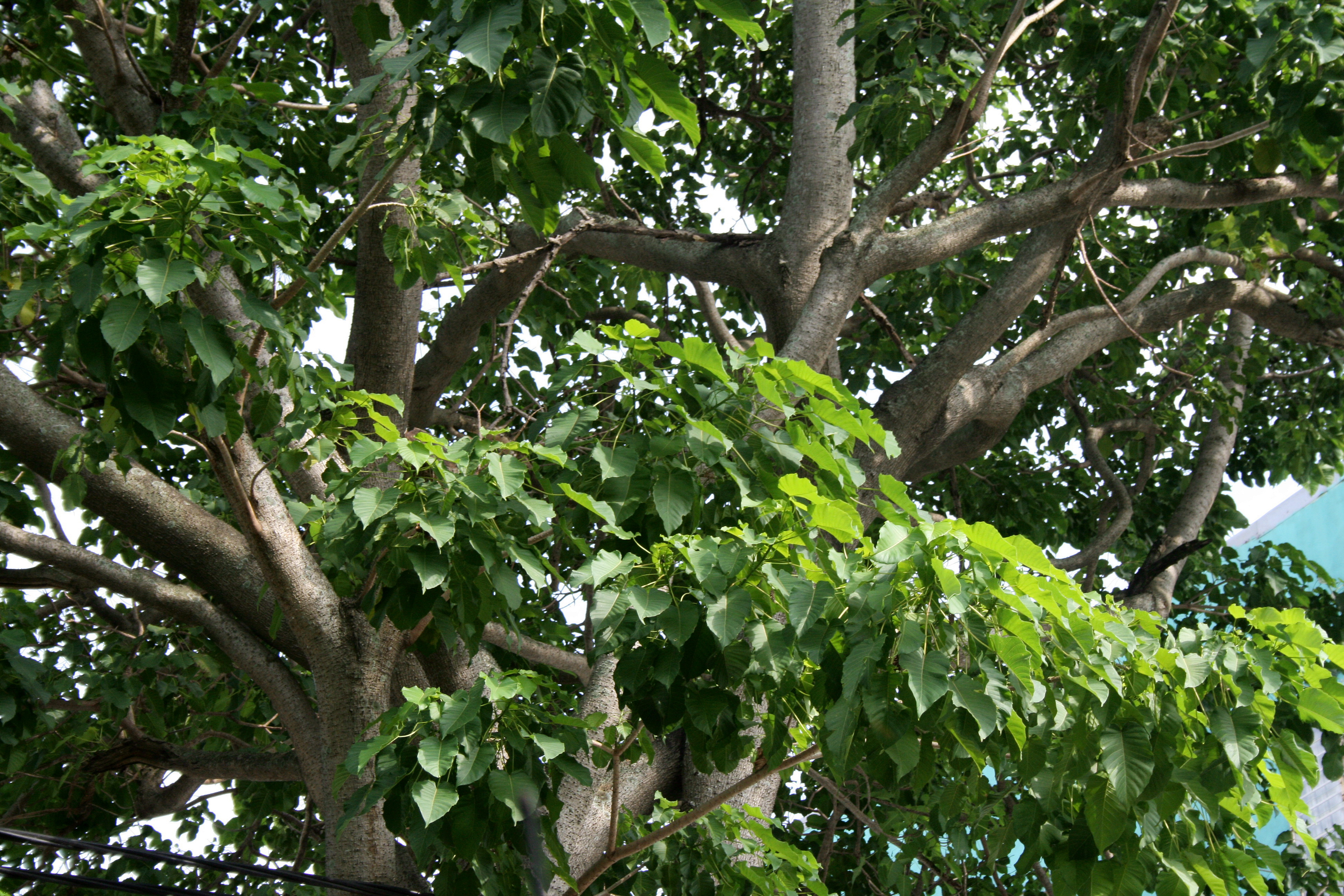
Hura crepitans in Vietnam

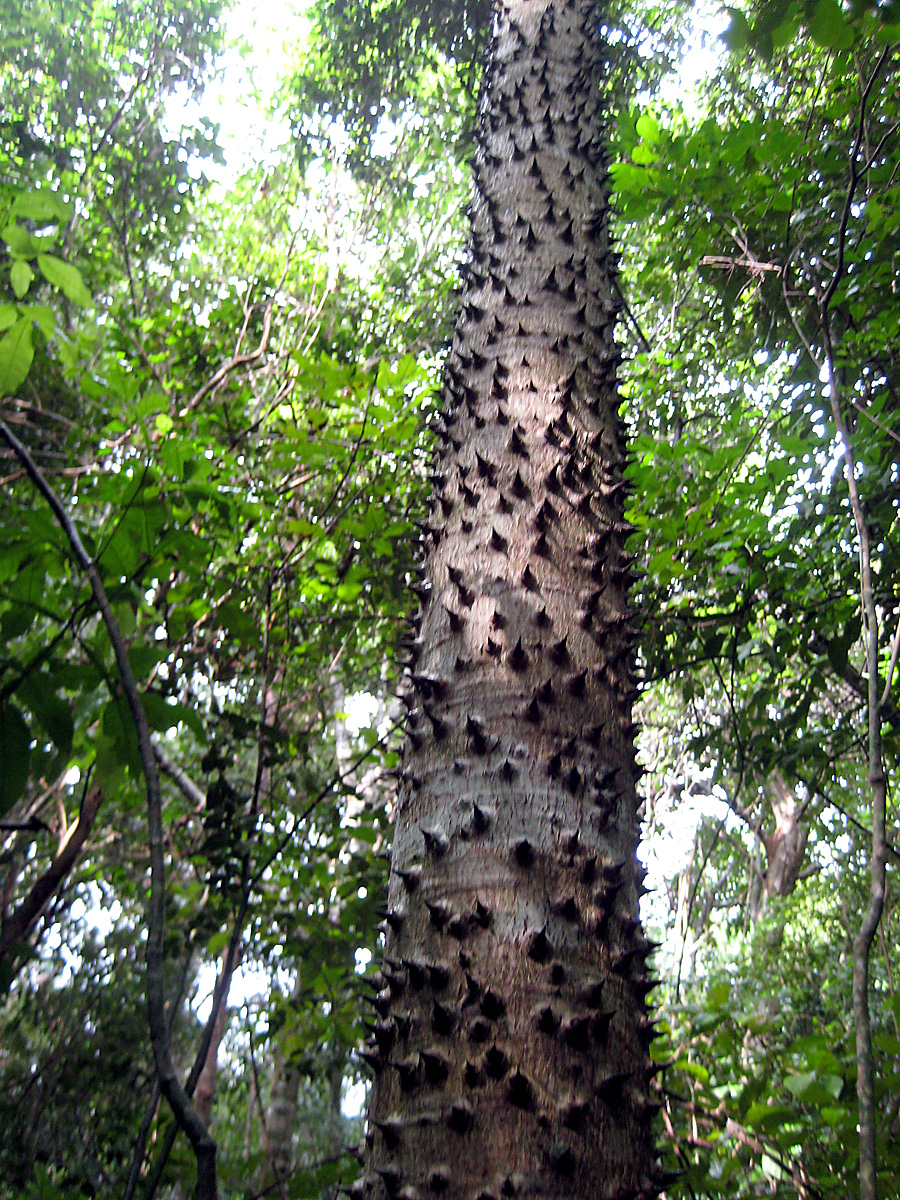
Hura crepitans in Saint John, U.S. Virgin Islands

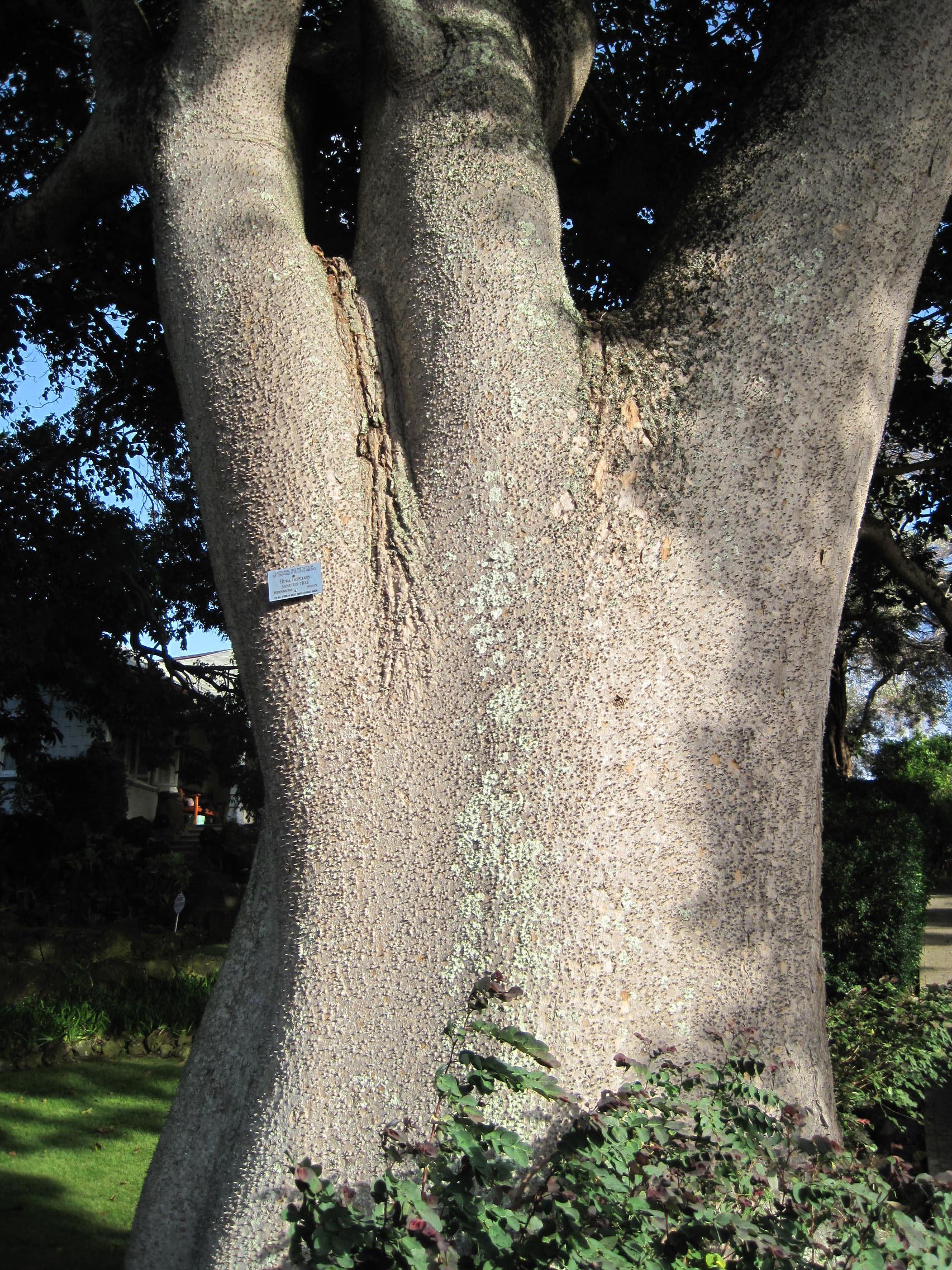
Spiny trunk of Hura crepitans

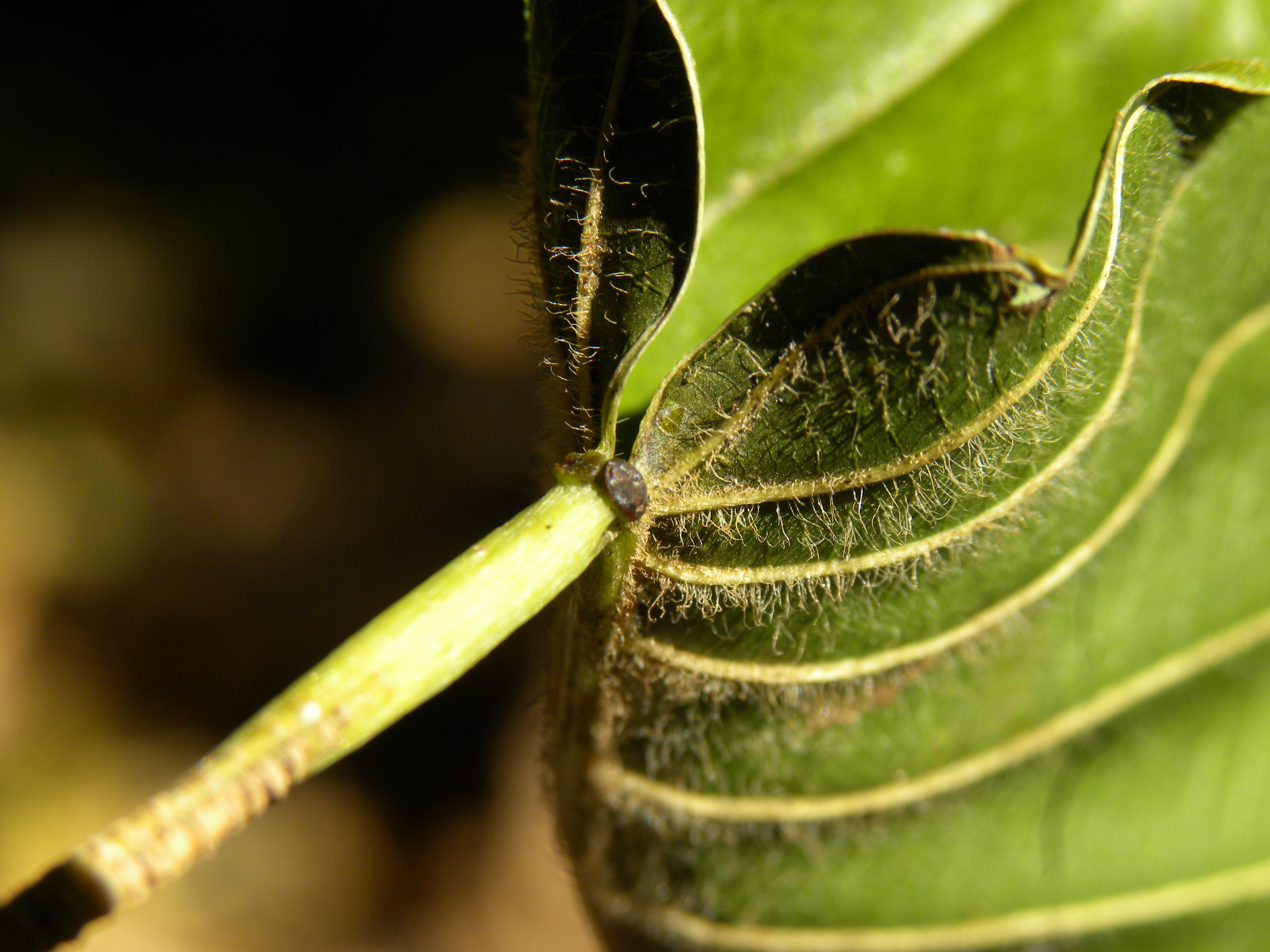
Leaf of Hura crepitans

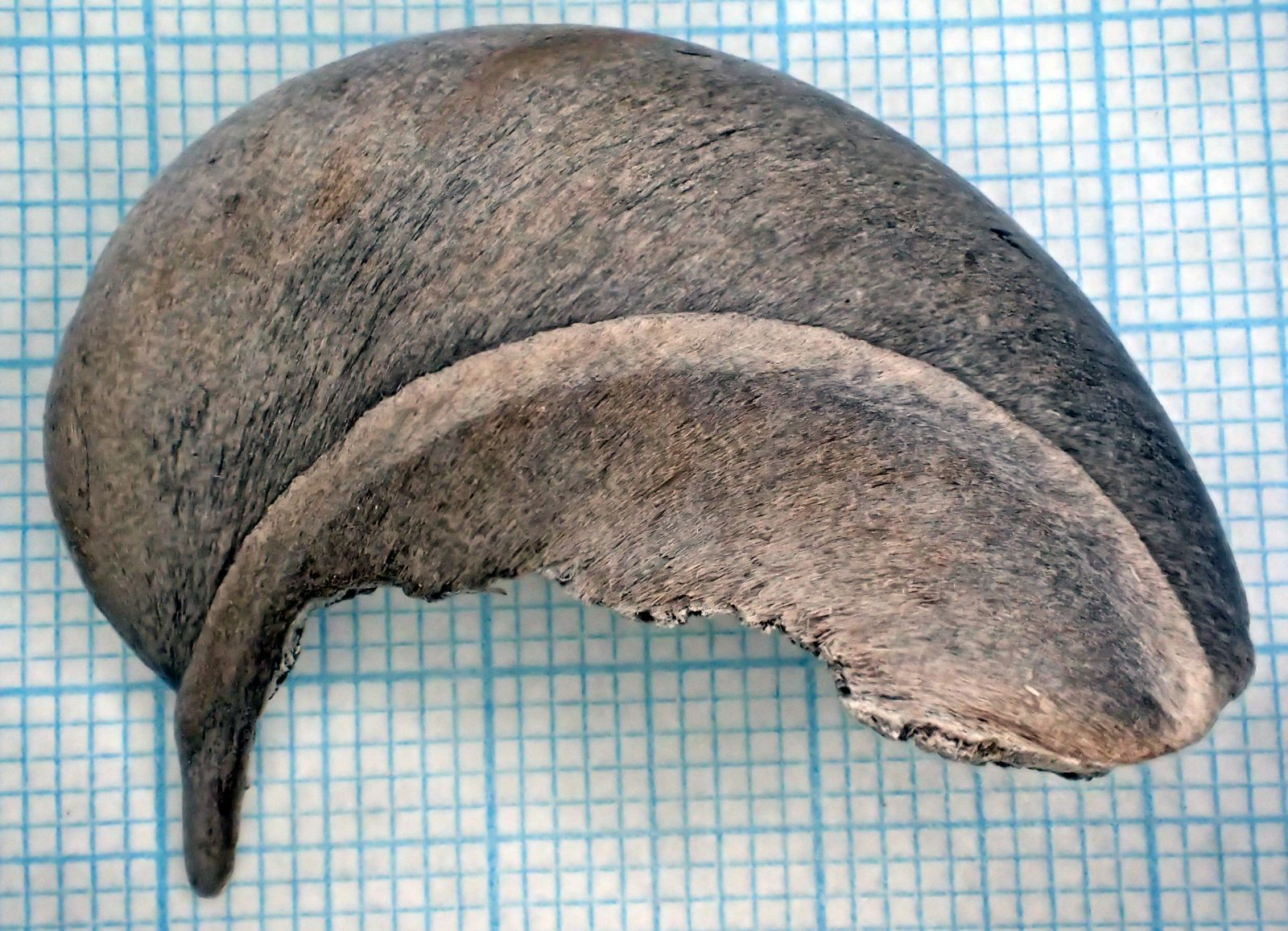
Hura crepitans fruit carpel

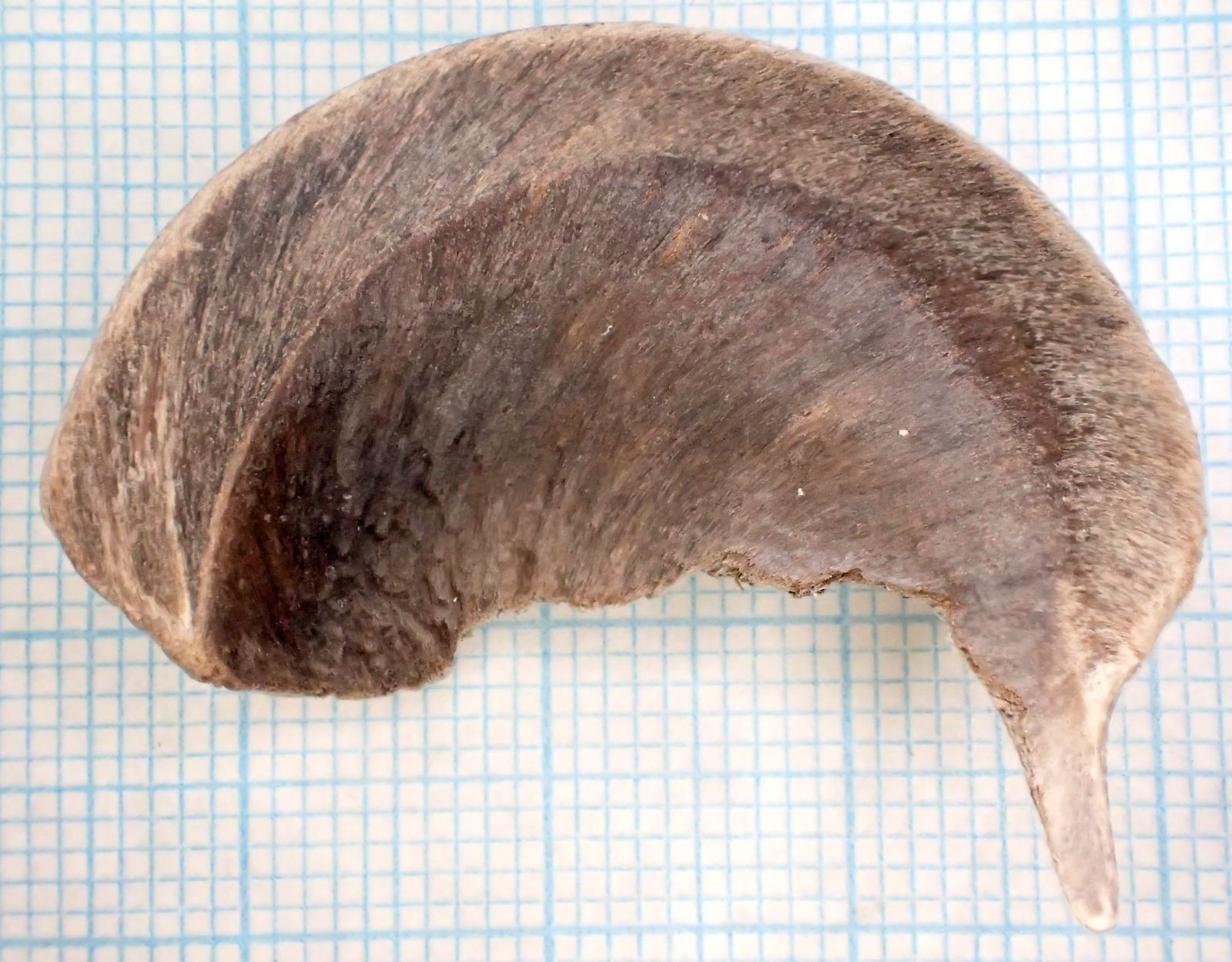
Hura crepitans fruit carpel, opposite side

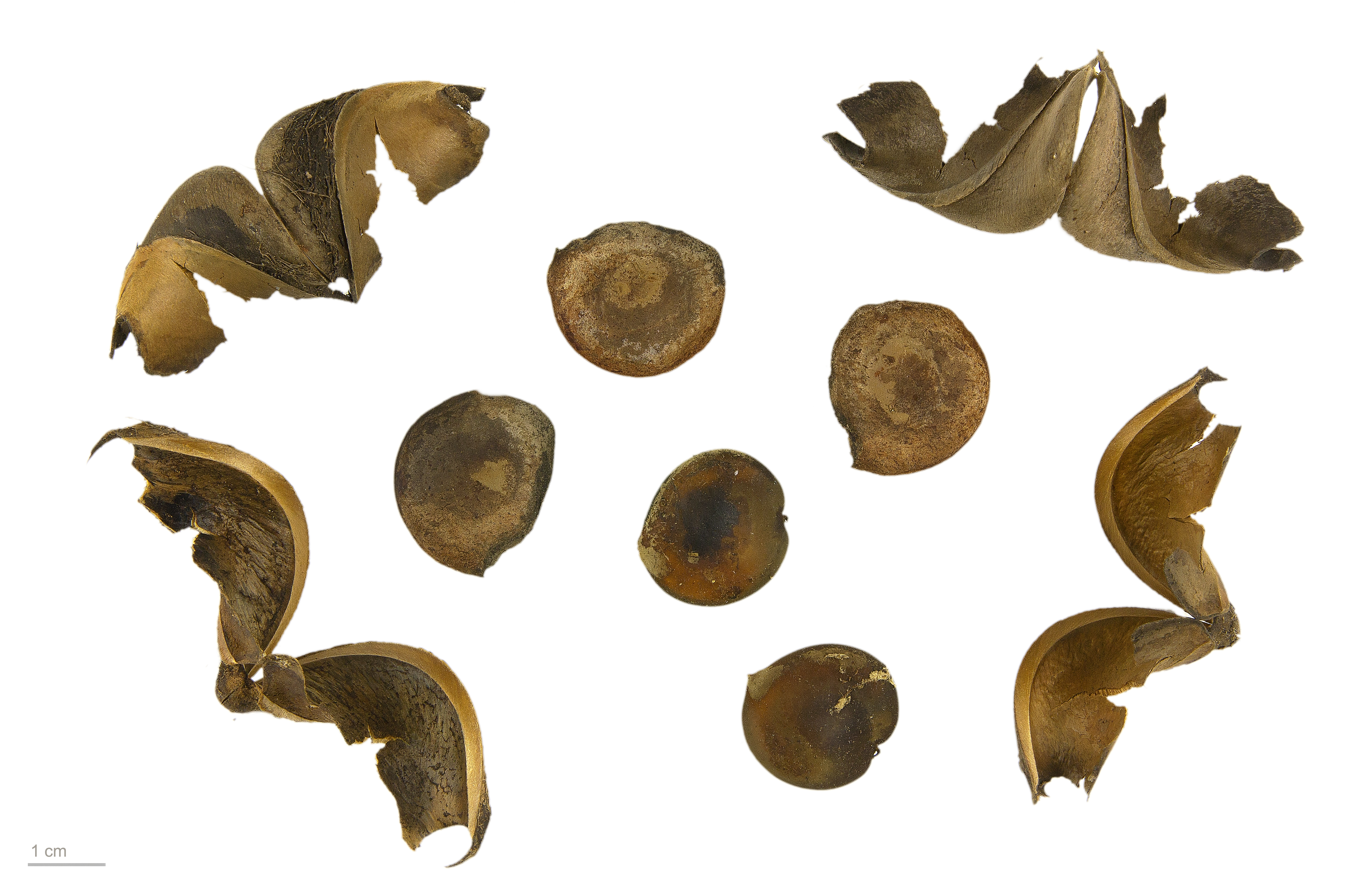
Hura crepitans - MHNT

== See also ==
- Manchineel

== Sources ==
- Kadiri, A. B.; Adeniran, S. (2016). "Study of the Anatomy of the Genus Hura L. (Euphorbiaceae)" (PDF). Ife Journal of Science. 18 (2): 413–426 – via ResearchGate.
