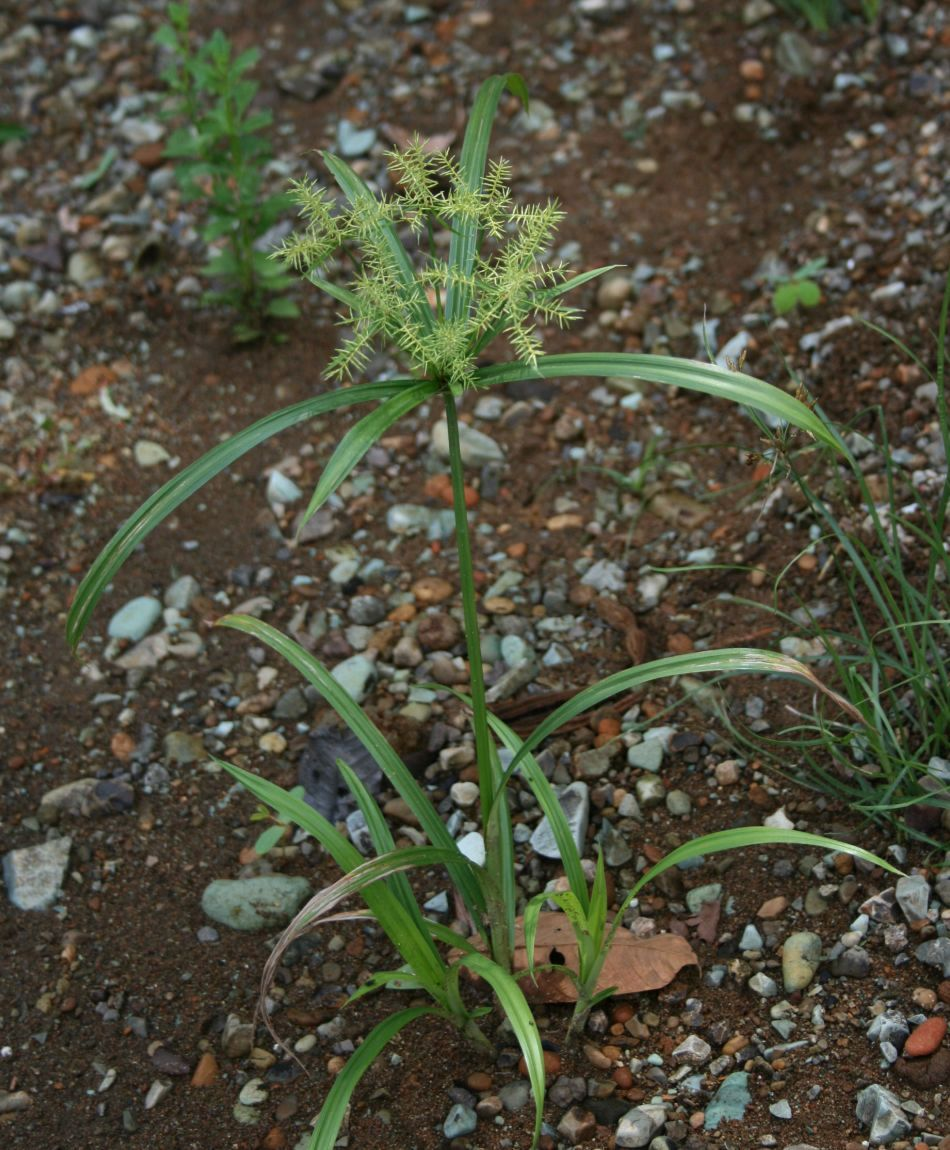

Conservation status
- Least Concern (IUCN 3.1)

- Secure (NatureServe)

Scientific classification
- Kingdom: Plantae
- Clade: Tracheophytes
- Clade: Angiosperms
- Clade: Monocots
- Clade: Commelinids
- Order: Poales
- Family: Cyperaceae
- Genus: Cyperus
- Species: C. odoratus

Binomial name
- Cyperus odoratus L.

Synonyms
- Cyperus odoratus: Diclidium odoratum (L.) Schrad. ex Nees; Papyrus odorata (L.) Willd.; Papyrus odorata (L.) Kunth; Torulinium odoratum (L.) S.S.Hooper; C. o. subsp. odoratus: Cyperus bracteolatus Steud.; Cyperus californicus S.Watson; Cyperus carruthii Alph.Wood; Cyperus consocius Steud. ex Jard.; Cyperus cubanus Liebm.; Cyperus densiflorus G.Mey.; Cyperus distans G.Mey., nom. illeg.; Cyperus eggersii Boeckeler; Cyperus eggersii var. laticeps Kük.; Cyperus engelmannii Steud.; Cyperus erythrorhizus Torr.; Cyperus familiaris Steud.; Cyperus ferax var. bulbifer Barros; Cyperus ferax var. densiflorus (G.Mey.) Kük.; Cyperus ferax var. engelmannii (Steud.) Kük. ex Osten; Cyperus ferax subsp. engelmannii (Steud.) Kük.; Cyperus ferax var. maximiliani (Schrad. ex Nees) Boeckeler; Cyperus ferax var. novae-hannoverae (Boeckeler) Kük.; Cyperus ferax f. parvus (Boeckeler) Kük.; Cyperus ferax subsp. speciosus (Vahl) Kük.; Cyperus ferax var. squarrosus (Britton) Kük.; Cyperus ferox Vahl; Cyperus ferruginescens Boeckeler; Cyperus flavicomus Pursh, nom. illeg.; Cyperus flexuosus Griseb., nom. illeg.; Cyperus fossarum Liebm.; Cyperus fossarum Schltdl., nom. illeg.; Cyperus fragilis Liebm.; Cyperus granadinus Liebm.; Cyperus haenkei J.Presl & C.Presl; Cyperus hamiltonii Kunth; Cyperus horizontalis Steud., nom. illeg.; Cyperus huarmensis (Kunth) M.C.Johnst.; Cyperus jubaeiflorus Rudge; Cyperus laetus var. obtusiflorus Boeckeler; Cyperus lenticularis Steud.; Cyperus lomentaceus Nees & Meyen ex Kunth; Cyperus longispicatus Norton, nom. illeg.; Cyperus lucidus Kunth, nom. illeg.; Cyperus macrocephalus var. eggersii (Boeckeler) S.D.Jones, Wipff & R.Carter; Cyperus maximiliani (Schrad. ex Nees) Griseb.; Cyperus michauxianus Schult.; Cyperus multibracteatus Boeckeler; Cyperus multiceps Hook. & Arn., nom. illeg.; Cyperus nitidulus Boeckeler; Cyperus nortonii A.Heller; Cyperus novae-hannoverae Boeckeler; Cyperus odoratus var. attenuatus Fosberg & Sachet; Cyperus odoratus var. curtispiculus Fosberg & Sachet; Cyperus odoratus var. engelmannii (Steud.) R.Carter, S.D.Jones & Wipff; Cyperus odoratus var. novae-hannoverae (Boeckeler) Fosberg & Sachet; Cyperus odoratus var. squarrosus (Britton) S.D.Jones, Wipff & R.Carter; Cyperus oerstedii Liebm.; Cyperus parvispiculatus Boeckeler; Cyperus parvus Boeckeler, nom. illeg.; Cyperus pennatus Boeckeler, nom. illeg.; Cyperus phleoides Seem., nom. illeg.; Cyperus poeoides Desv.; Cyperus pohlianus (Nees) Kuntze; Cyperus prescottianus Hook. & Arn.; Cyperus pseudostrigosus Steud.; Cyperus raiateensis J.W.Moore; Cyperus raphiostachys Link; Cyperus reineckei Boeckeler; Cyperus rufinus Liebm.; Cyperus sanctae-crucis Liebm.; Cyperus speciosus Torr., nom. illeg.; Cyperus speciosus Vahl; Cyperus speciosus var. ferruginescens (Boeckeler) Britton; Cyperus speciosus var. parvus Britton; Cyperus speciosus var. squarrosus Britton; Cyperus stellatus Rudge; Cyperus tenuior Engelm.; Cyperus vahlii Boeckeler, nom. illeg.; Cyperus virginicus Jacq. ex Steud.; Diclidium auriculatum Nees; Diclidium lenticulare Schrad. ex Nees; Diclidium lomentaceum Nees; Diclidium maximiliani Schrad. ex Nees; Diclidium reinwardtii Schrad. ex Nees; Diclidium uliginosum Schrad. ex Nees; Mariscus familiaris (Steud.) T.Koyama; Mariscus huarmensis Kunth; Mariscus pohlianus Nees; Mariscus rhaphiostachys Liebm.; Torulinium confertum Desv.; Torulinium eggersii (Boeckeler) C.B.Clarke; Torulinium macrocephalum var. davidsei C.D.Adams; Torulinium macrocephalum var. eggersii (Boeckeler) C.D.Adams; Torulinium michauxianum C.B.Clarke; C. o. subsp. transcaucasicus: Cyperus ferax subsp. transcaucasicus Kük.; Torulinium caucasicum Palla; Torulinium ferax subsp. caucasicum (Palla) Hadac

= Cyperus odoratus =

Fragrant flatsedge

Species of plant

Cyperus odoratus is a species of flowering plant in the sedge family Cyperaceae. It is known by the common names fragrant flatsedge and rusty flatsedge. It has a pantropical distribution that extends into the temperate regions of North and South America. The species is quite variable and may in fact be more than one species included under a single name.

== Description ==
Cyperus odoratus sensu lato is an annual sedge approaching half a meter in height on average but known to grow much taller. It usually has some long, thin leaves around the base of the plant. The inflorescence is made up of one to several cylindrical spikes, each resembling a bottle brush. There are 5 to 8 leaf-like bracts at the base of the inflorescence. Each of the spikes bears a large number of flat, oval-shaped spikelets. Each spikelet is usually light brown to reddish-brown and has a few to over 20 flowers. Each flower is covered by a tough, flat scale (a kind of bract) with a visible midvein. The fruit is a flat achene less than two millimeters long.

Cyperus odoratus sensu stricto is similar to Cyperus engelmannii. The floral scales of Cyperus odoratus are overlapping. In contrast, the mature floral scales of Cyperus engelmannii do not overlap, that is, the tip of each scale does not reach the base of the next scale on the same side of the spikelet. The mature achenes of Cyperus odoratus are slightly ellipsoid, while those of Cyperus engelmannii are narrow with linear (parallel) edges. The widths of fully developed achenes are 0.5–0.7 mm and 0.3–0.4 mm, respectively.

Cyperus odoratus and Cyperus engelmannii are the only two Cyperus species in temperate North America with spikelets that eventually break into one-seeded segments. At maturity, each spikelet breaks into segments each consisting of a scale and an achene held together by a portion of the floral axis.

== Taxonomy ==
Cyperus odoratus was first described by the Swedish botanist Carl Linnaeus in 1753. Linnaeus based his diagnosis on a specimen collected along a riverbank in North America ("habitat in America ad fluviorum ripas").

As of October 2025, the following infraspecific names are accepted by both Plants of the World Online and World Flora Online:

- Cyperus odoratus subsp. odoratus
- Cyperus odoratus subsp. transcaucasicus (Kük.) Kukkonen

The typical subspecies Cyperus odoratus subsp. odoratus has dozens of synonyms. Cyperus odoratus var. engelmannii (Steud.) R.Carter, S.D.Jones & Wipff is a homotypic synonym of Cyperus engelmannii Steud.

Cyperus odoratus is a member of Cyperus subgen. Diclidium (Schrad. ex Nees) C.B.Clarke. It is one of two species in subgenus Diclidium whose range extends into temperate North America (the other species being Cyperus engelmannii).

== Distribution and habitat ==
Cyperus odoratus sensu lato is found in much of the tropical and warm temperate world, including South, Central, and North America, Southeast Asia, some Pacific Islands, Australia, New Guinea, Madagascar, and central Africa. It is a plant of wet, muddy areas, including disturbed and altered sites. Cyperus odoratus subsp. transcaucasicus is native to Iran, Iraq, and the South Caucasus.

== See also ==
- List of Cyperus species
- Glossary of botanical terms

== Bibliography ==
- Linnaeus, Carl (1753). Species Plantarum: exhibentes plantas rite cognitas, ad genera relatas, cum differentiis specificis, nominibus trivialibus, synonymis selectis, locis natalibus, secundum systema sexuale digestas (1st ed.). Stockholm: Impensis Laurentii Salvii.
- Naczi, R.F.C. (2017). "Portion of Cyperaceae, the sedge family: Cyperus". In Naczi, R.F.C.; Abbott, J.R.; and collaborators (eds.). New Manual of Vascular Plants of Northeastern United States and Adjacent Canada, compiled in 2016, 2017. Bronx, NY: New York Botanical Garden Press.
- Standley, Lisa A. (2025). "Cyperus engelmannii in New England". Rhodora. 126 (1006): 178–182. doi:10.3119/25-08.
- Tucker, Gordon C.; Gandhi, Kanchi N. (2019). "Nomenclatural notes on Cyperus odoratus and related species (Cyperaceae)". Harvard Papers in Botany. 24 (2): 349–357. doi:10.3100/hpib.v24iss2.2019.n18. ISSN 1938-2944.
