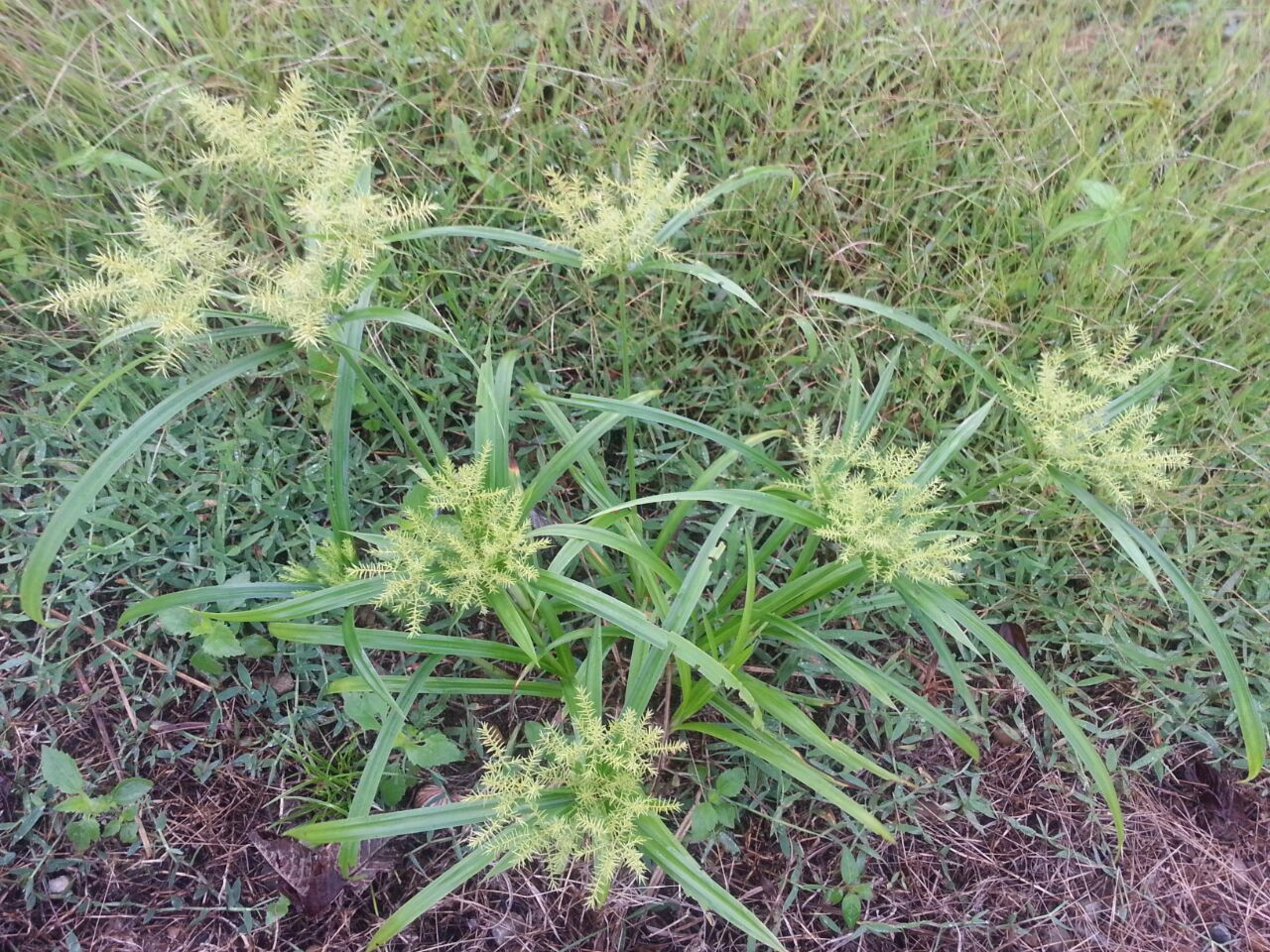

Conservation status
- Least Concern (IUCN 3.1)

Scientific classification
- Kingdom: Plantae
- Clade: Tracheophytes
- Clade: Angiosperms
- Clade: Monocots
- Clade: Commelinids
- Order: Poales
- Family: Cyperaceae
- Genus: Cyperus
- Species: C. luzulae

Binomial name
- Cyperus luzulae (L.) Retz., 1786

= Cyperus luzulae =

Species of sedge

Cyperus luzulae is a species of sedge that is native to parts of southern parts of North America, most of Central America and northern parts of South America.

== See also ==
- List of Cyperus species
