= Cyperus ferax =

Scientific classification
- Kingdom: Plantae
- Clade: Tracheophytes
- Clade: Angiosperms
- Clade: Monocots
- Clade: Commelinids
- Order: Poales
- Family: Cyperaceae
- Genus: Cyperus
- Species: C. ferax

Binomial name
- Cyperus ferax Rich.

Species of sedge

Cyperus ferax is a species of sedge that is endemic to an area of the Americas.

The species was first formally described by the botanist Louis Claude Richard in 1792.

== See also ==
- List of Cyperus species
