= List of butterflies of Trinidad and Tobago =

List of the butterfly species of Trinidad and Tobago, an island nation located in the Caribbean region off the northeast coast of South America.

The combined efforts of generations of resident and visiting naturalists have helped to make the butterfly fauna of Tobago well known. Some 129 species have been recorded on the island of Tobago that has a land area of only 300 km^{2} (116 mi^{2}) and is approximately 42 km long and 10 km wide.

This list follows Malcolm Barcant (1970) who is the main source of information on the butterflies of Tobago. His book is no longer in print, but used copies are available at booksellers. Barcant gives each species an English common name, but many of these were never taken up. Barcant's English name and the more widely accepted English name are given in the list below. Since 1970 many of the Latin names used by Barcant have also changed. The 2004 catalog of Lamas was used to update the taxonomy.

There is little data on the seasonal distribution or abundance of the listed butterflies. In general, butterflies are more abundant in the wet season. However, in the dry season, when most people visit, and especially if the dry season is a wet one, there are many whites/yellows on the wing. These are hard to identify without capture. Other butterflies commonly seen in the dry season in the south west of the island are the monarch butterfly (Danaus plexippus), the white peacock (Anartia jatrophe), the brown peacock (Anartia amathea), the West Indian buckeye (Junonia evarete) and the red rim (Biblis hyperia). Away from the flat south west towards Arnos Vale, there are many other butterflies to be found, including skippers and blues and the blue tinted handkerchief (Dynamine theseus). In the rain forest, on the main ridge, butterflies are quite scarce at this time of year.

== Papilionidae, swallowtails ==
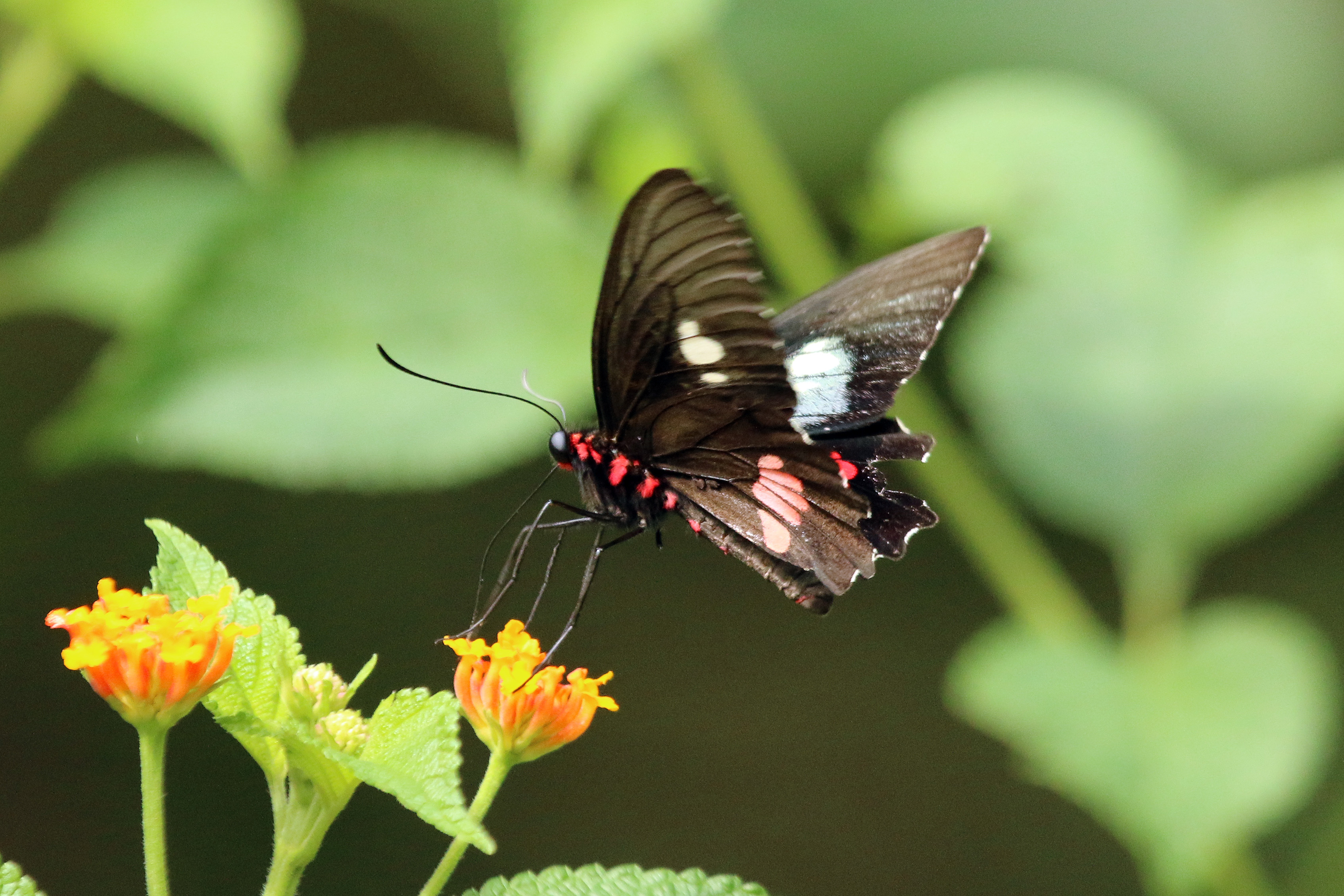
Parides neophilus parianus, Trinidad

- Battus polydamas, black page or gold rim
- Papilio androgeus, Androgeus, queen page or queen swallowtail
- Parides neophilus parianus, spear-winged cattleheart

== Pieridae, whites and yellows ==
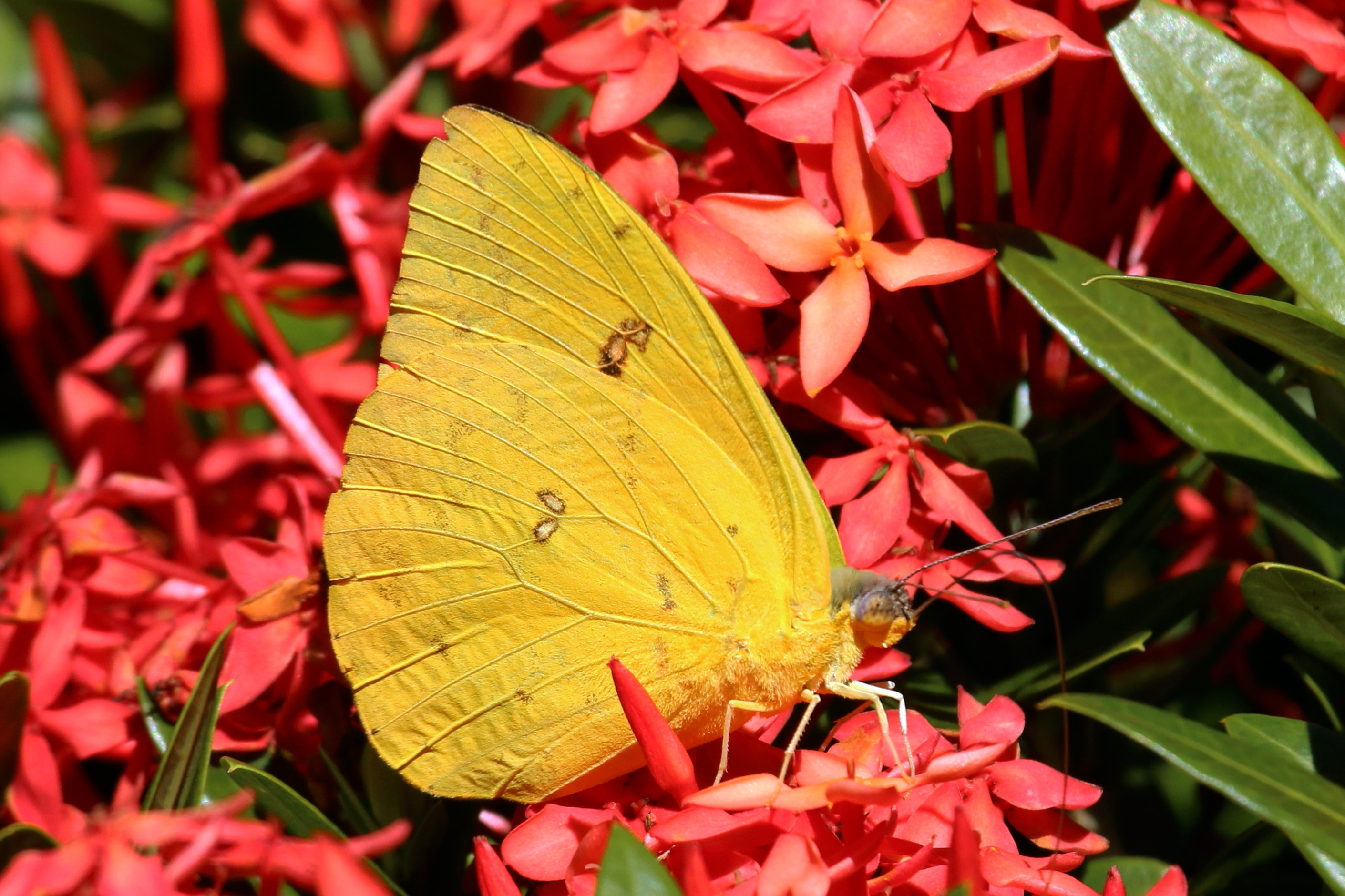
Phoebis sennae sennae, Tobago

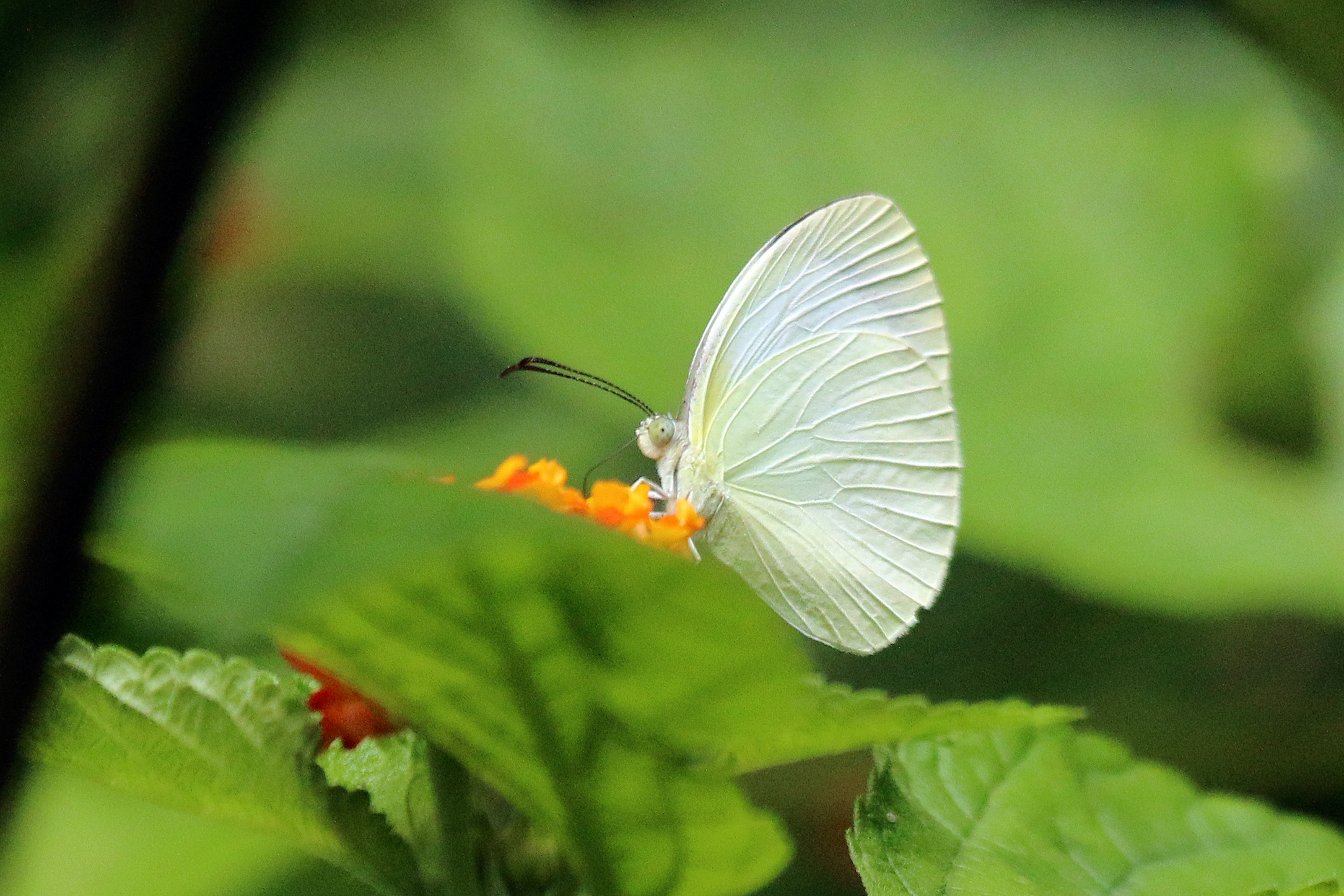
Eurema albula, Trinidad

- Aphrissa statira, yellow migrant
- Phoebis sennae sennae, cloudless sulphur
- Phoebis argante, apricot
- Phoebis philea, orange-barred sulphur
- Anteos maerula, yellow angled sulphur or gonatryx
- Pyrisitia proterpia, tailed orange or little jaune (called Eureme proerpia by Barcant)
- Eurema albula, ghost yellow or small white
- Eurema venusta, little yellow
- Eurema leuce, small yellow
- Eurema elathea, small banded yellow
- Eurema arbela, jagged-edged yellow (called Eureme gratiosa by Barcant)
- Appias drusilla, pure white
- Ascia monuste, cabbage white

== Nymphalidae, four-footed butterflies ==
Their taxonomy is currently being revised.

=== Satyrinae, browns ===
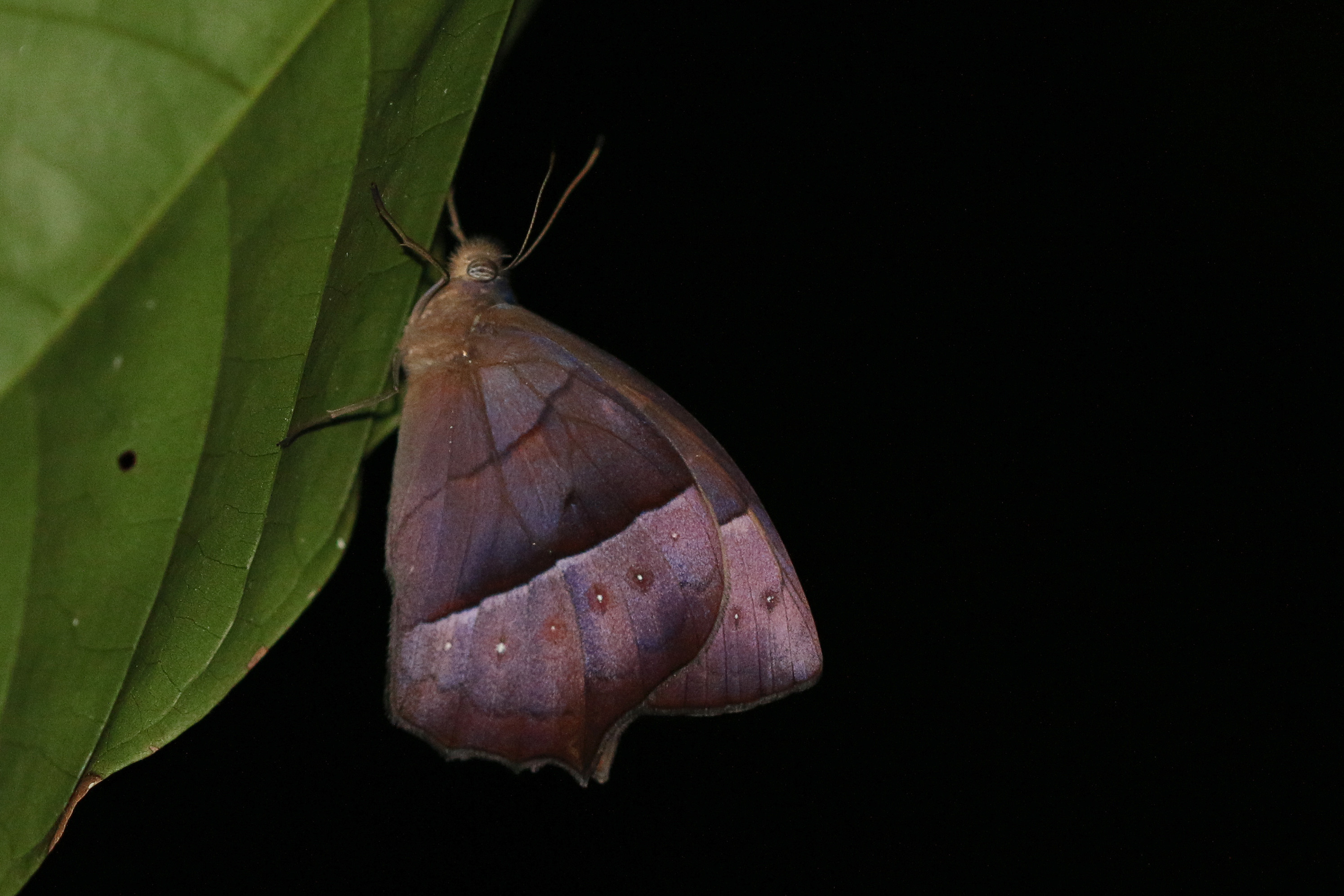
Taygetis virgilia, Trinidad

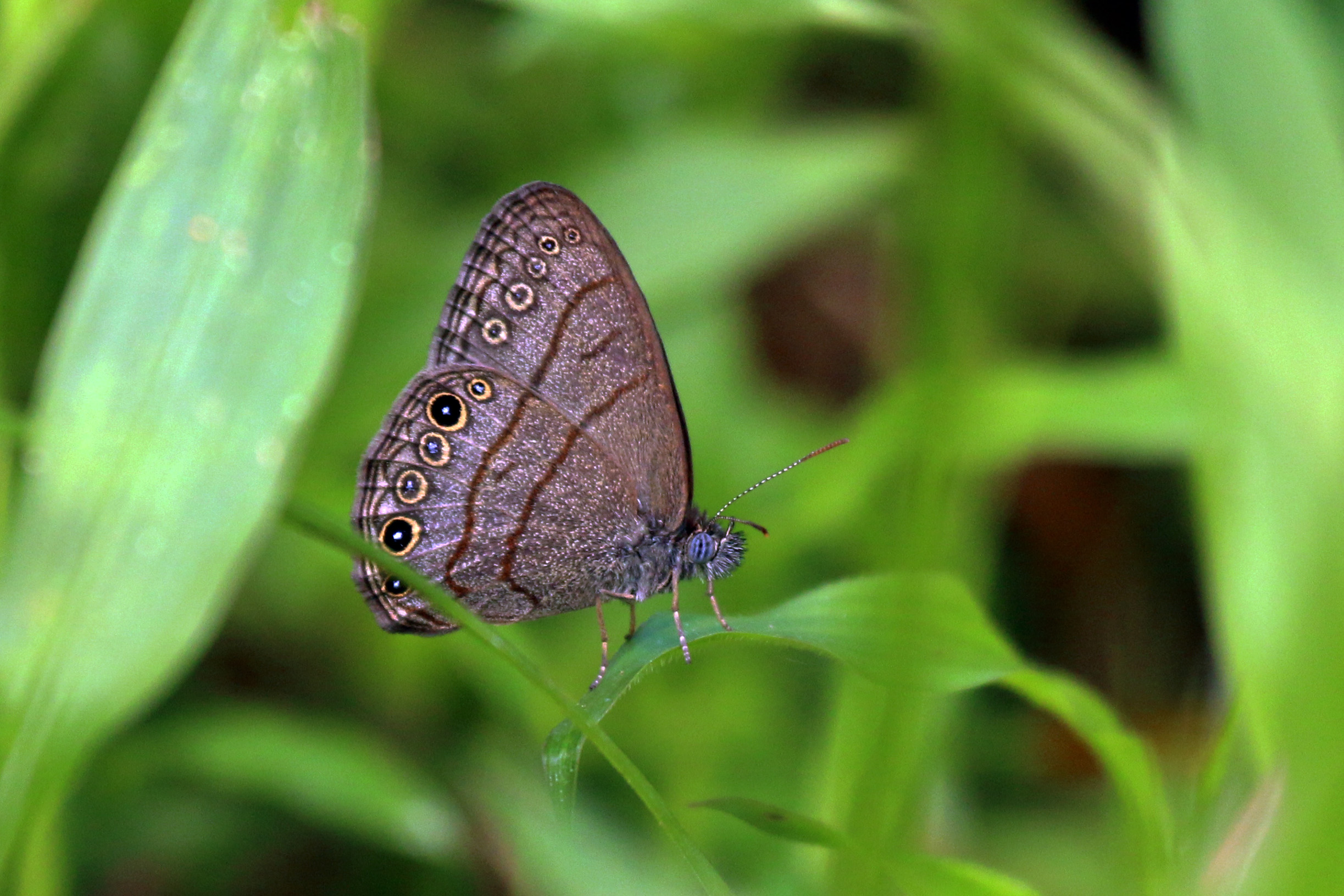
Hermeuptychia hermes, Trinidad

- Taygetis echo, echo satyr
- Taygetis laches
- Euptychia hesione
- Euptychia myncea
- Euptychia terrestris
- Hermeuptychia hermes
- Euptychia junia
- Euptychia libye
- Cissia penelope, Penelope's satyr
- Cissia palladia, Butler's satyr

=== Danainae ===
- Danaus plexippus, monarch butterfly

=== Ithomiinae ===
- Pteronymia alissa, small rare blue transparent (called P. amandes by Barcant)
- Ithomia pellucida, blue transparent
- Hymenitis andromica, rare blue transparent

=== Heliconiinae, longwing butterflies ===
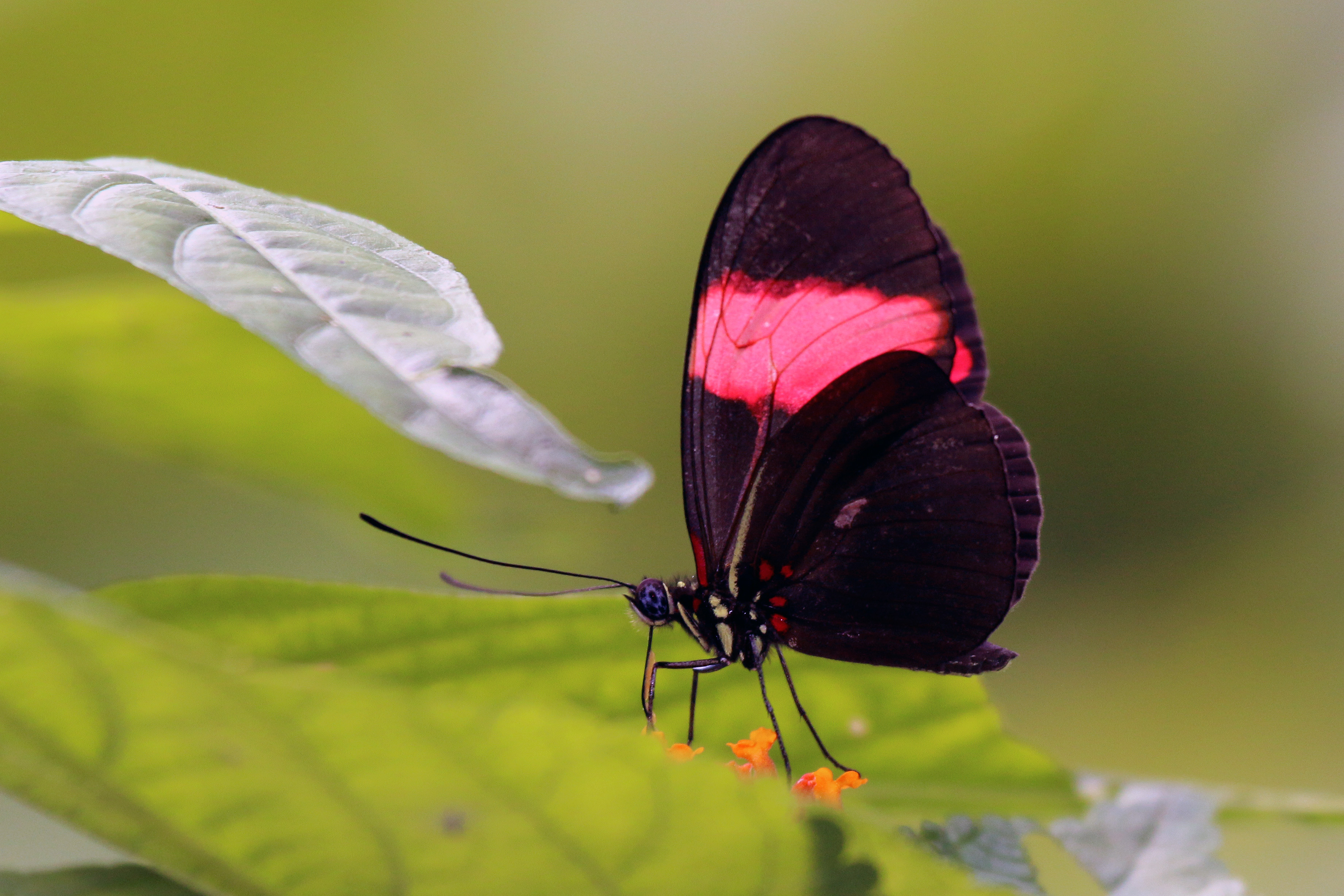
Heliconius erato, Trinidad

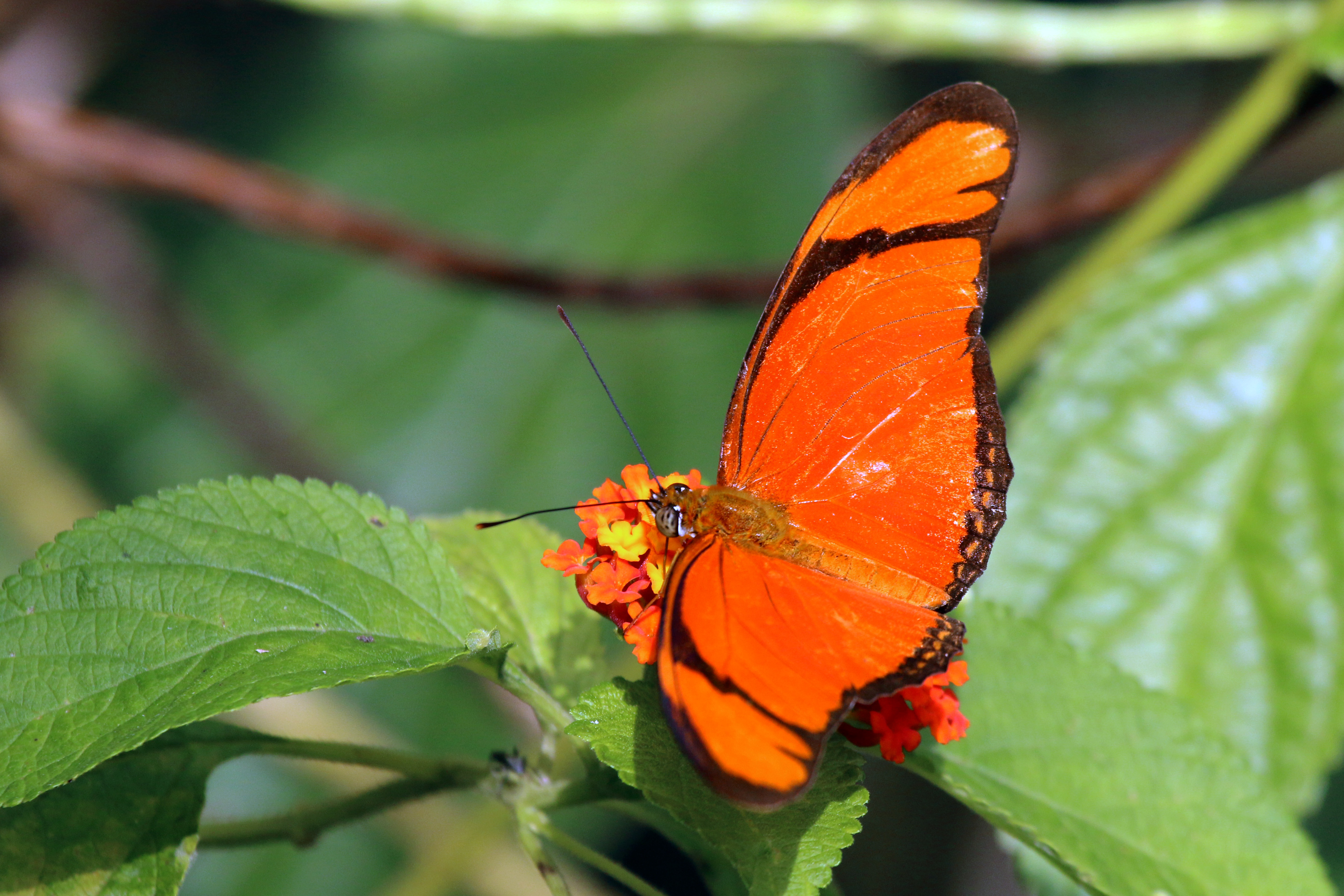
Dryas iulia iulia, Trinidad

- Heliconius melpomene tessa, postman
- Heliconius erato tobagoensis, small postman or red postman
- Heliconius ethilla, ethilia longwing
- Eueides aliphera, small flambeau (called Heliconius aliphera by Barcant)
- Eueides isabella, Isabella's heliconian
- Dryas iulia, flambeau or Julia butterfly (called Calaenis iulia by Barcant)
- Agraulis vanillae, silver spotted flambeau or Gulf fritillary

=== Limenitidinae, admirals ===
- Adelpha iphiclus, Iphiclus sister

=== Nymphalinae ===
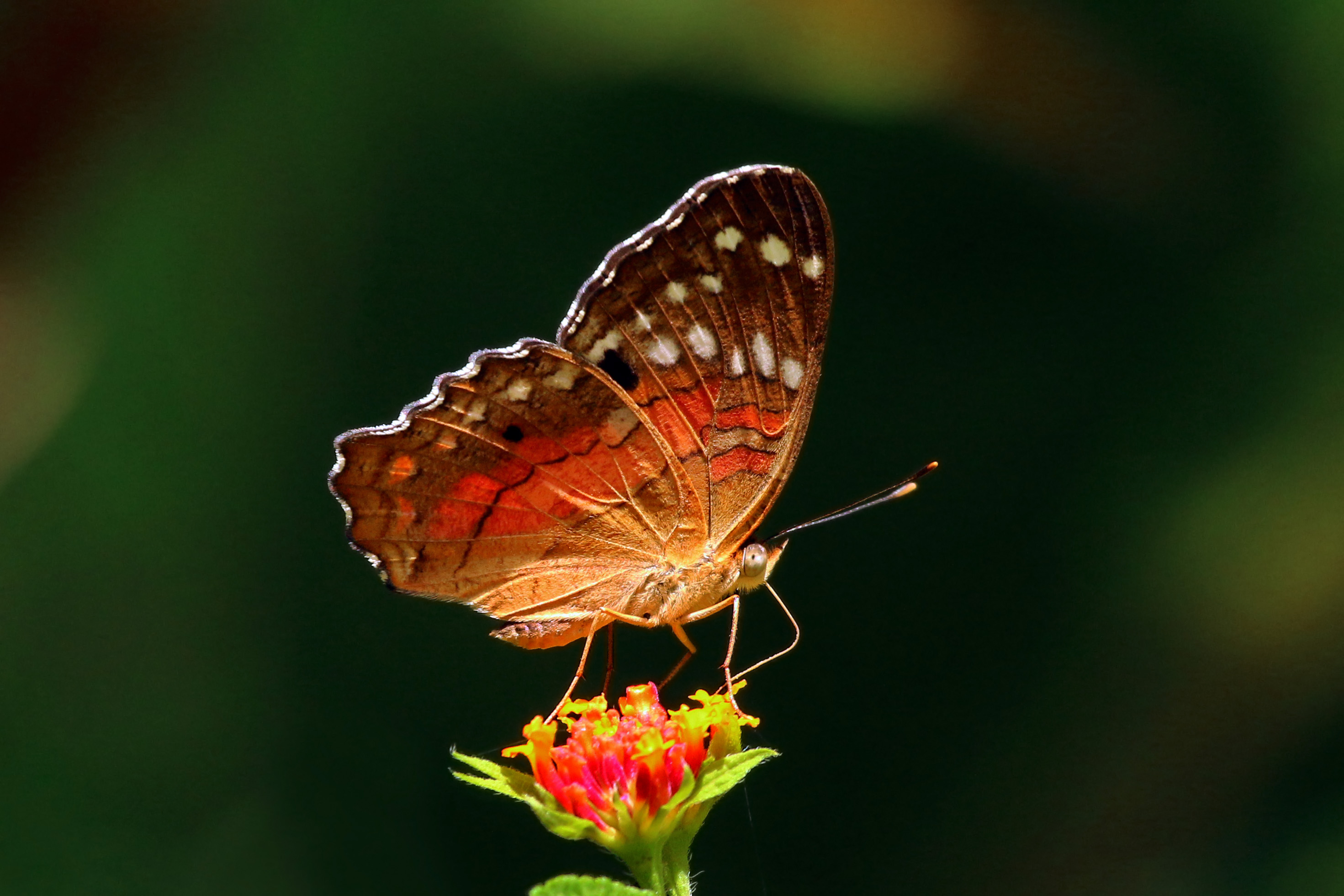
Anartia amathea, Trinidad

- Hypanartia lethe, orange admiral
- Hypolimnas misippus, Danaid eggfly
- Anartia jatrophae jatrophae, white peacock
- Anartia amathea, scarlet peacock
- Junonia evarete evarete, West Indian buckeye

=== Biblidinae ===
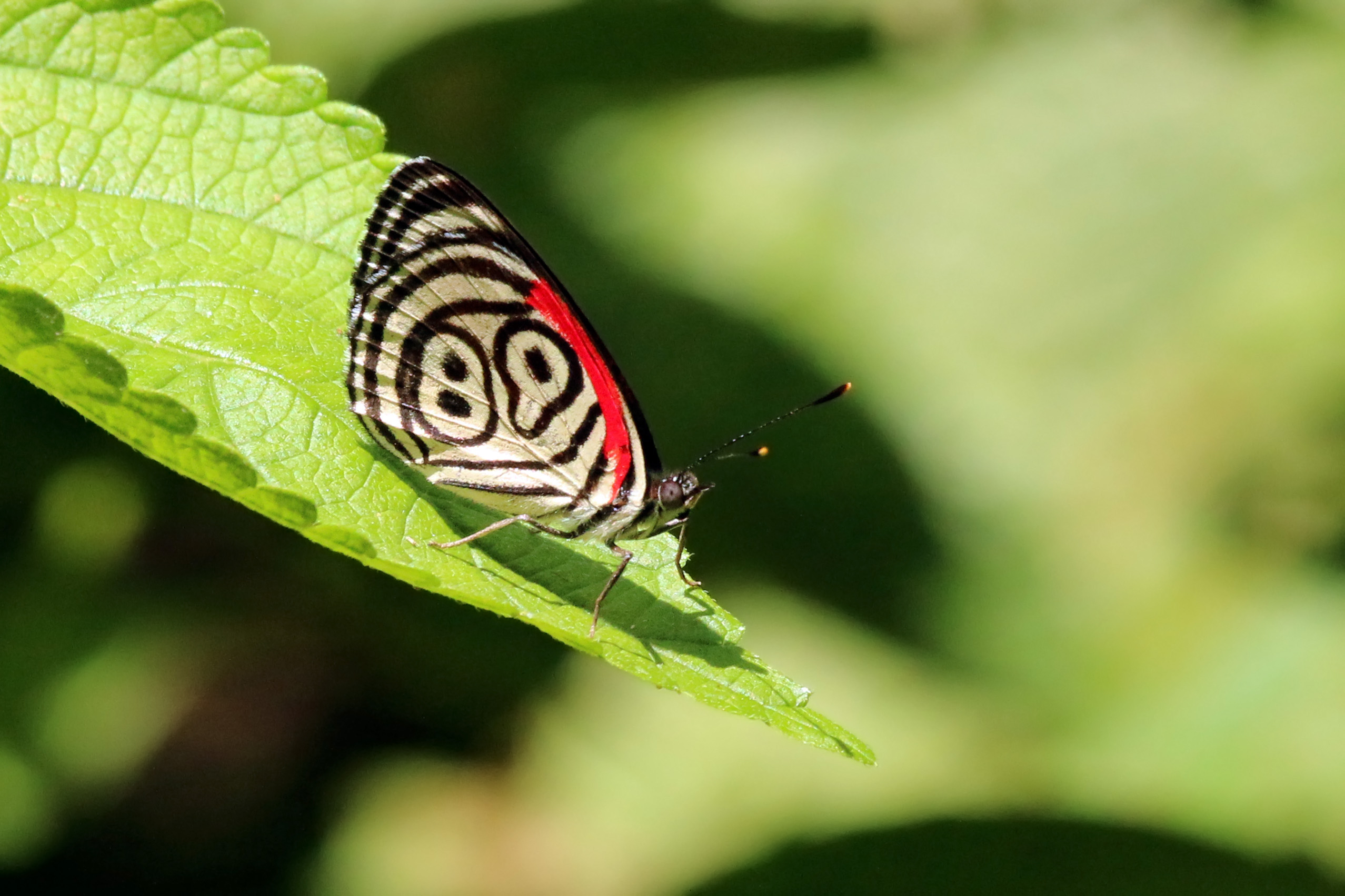
Diaethria clymena

- Dynamine theseus, blue tinted handkerchief
- Dynamine mylitta, large dynamine
- Hamadryas februa, grey cracker
- Mestra hypermestra, grey handkerchief
- Biblis hyperia, red rim
- Vanessa cardui, painted lady
- Marpesia petreus, ruddy daggerwing or tailed flambeau
- Historis odius, grape shoemaker
- Diaethria clymena, Cramer's eighty-eight

=== Charaxinae ===
- Archaeoprepona demophoon, silver king shoemaker (called Prepona antimache by Barcant)
- Prepona laertes, purple king shoemaker

=== Morphinae ===
==== Morphini, morphos ====
- Morpho peleides, morpho butterfly (called emperor butterfly by Barcant)

==== Brassolini, owl butterflies ====
- Caligo eurilochus, owl butterfly or forest blue mort
- Caligo teucer, owl butterfly or cocoa blue mort
- Opsiphanes cassiae

== Riodinidae, metalmarks ==
- Perophthalma tullius, grey nymph
- Anteros formosus, gold drop
- Lymnas iarbas, underleaf (maybe the same species as Melanis iarbas)
- Lymnas xarifa, orange-tipped underleaf
- Mesene phareus, red devil
- Lasaia agesilas, shining blue lasaia or green lasaia
- Emesis caeneus, black-speckled emesis
- Emesis progne, small brown emesis
- Theope eudocia, orange theope
- Theope virgilius, cream theope or blue-based theope
- Synargis calyce, blue transparent
- Hymenitis andromica, variable lemmark or brown and cream nymula

== Lycaenidae, blues ==
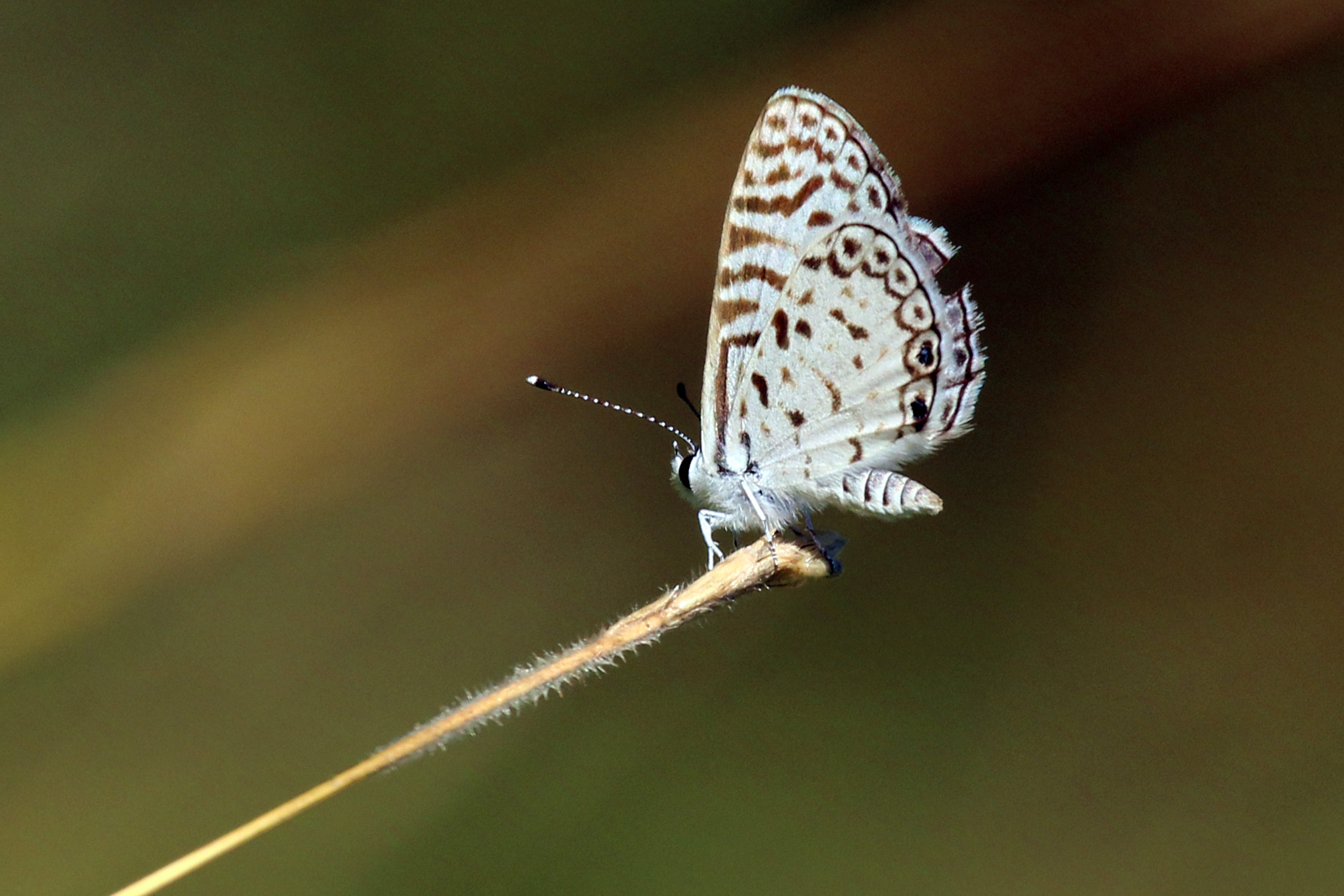
Leptotes cassius

- Hemiargus hanno, common blue
- Leptotes cassius, Cassius blue, tropical striped blue or meadow blue
- Strymon faunalia (called Leptotes faunalia by Barcant)
- Strymon bubastus (called Leptotes bubastus by Barcant)
- Tmolus basalides,
- Ministrymon echion, four-spotted hairstreak or red-spotted hairstreak (called Leptotes bubastus by Barcant)
- Calycopis beon (maybe the same species as C. isobeon, the dusty blue hairstreak)
- Calycopis hesperitis
- Calycopis cyphara
- Calycopis sangala
- Calycopis spurina, brick-spotted blue
- Calicopis calus, violet-tinted hairstreak
- Chalybs herodotus, large green hairstreak
- Chalybs simaethis, silver-banded hairstreak
- Rekoa palegon, gold-bordered hairstreak or slated hairstreak
- Rekoa zebina, Zebina hairstreak or double-spotted slate wing (called Thecla zebiina by Barcant)
- Pseudolycaena marsyas, Cambridge blue or giant hairstreak

== Hesperiidae, skippers ==
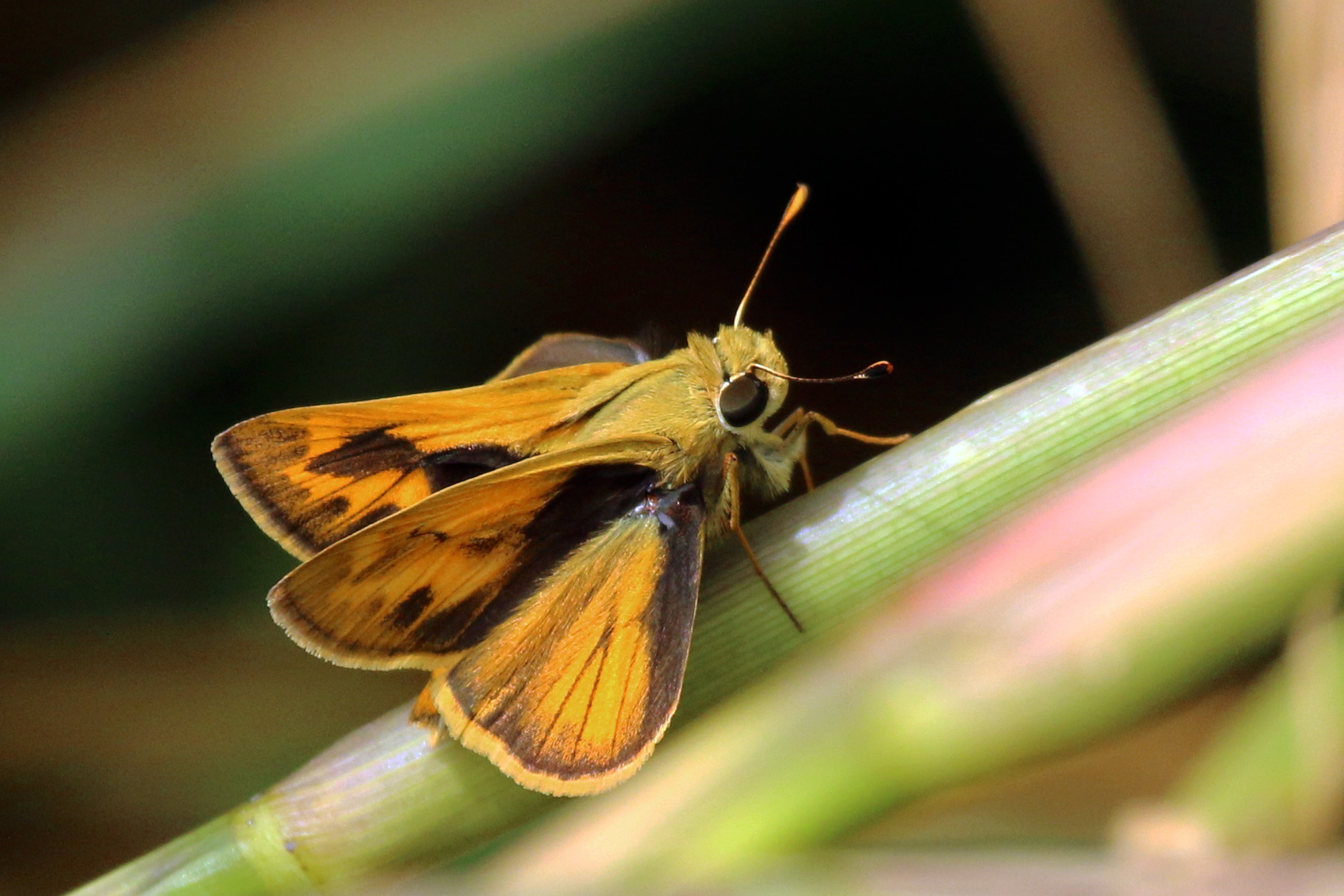
Polites vibex praeceps, Tobago

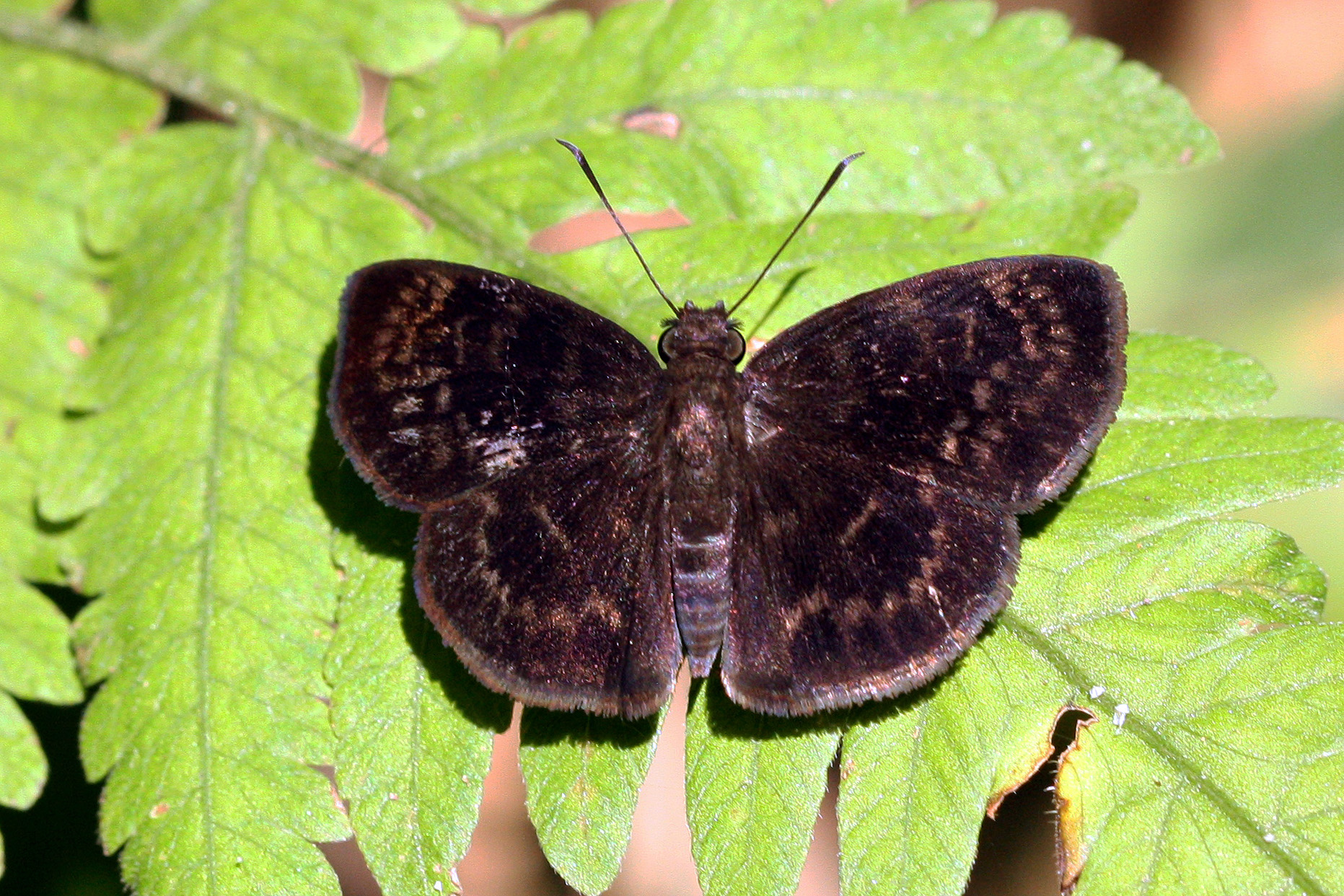
Ouleus fridericus, Trinidad

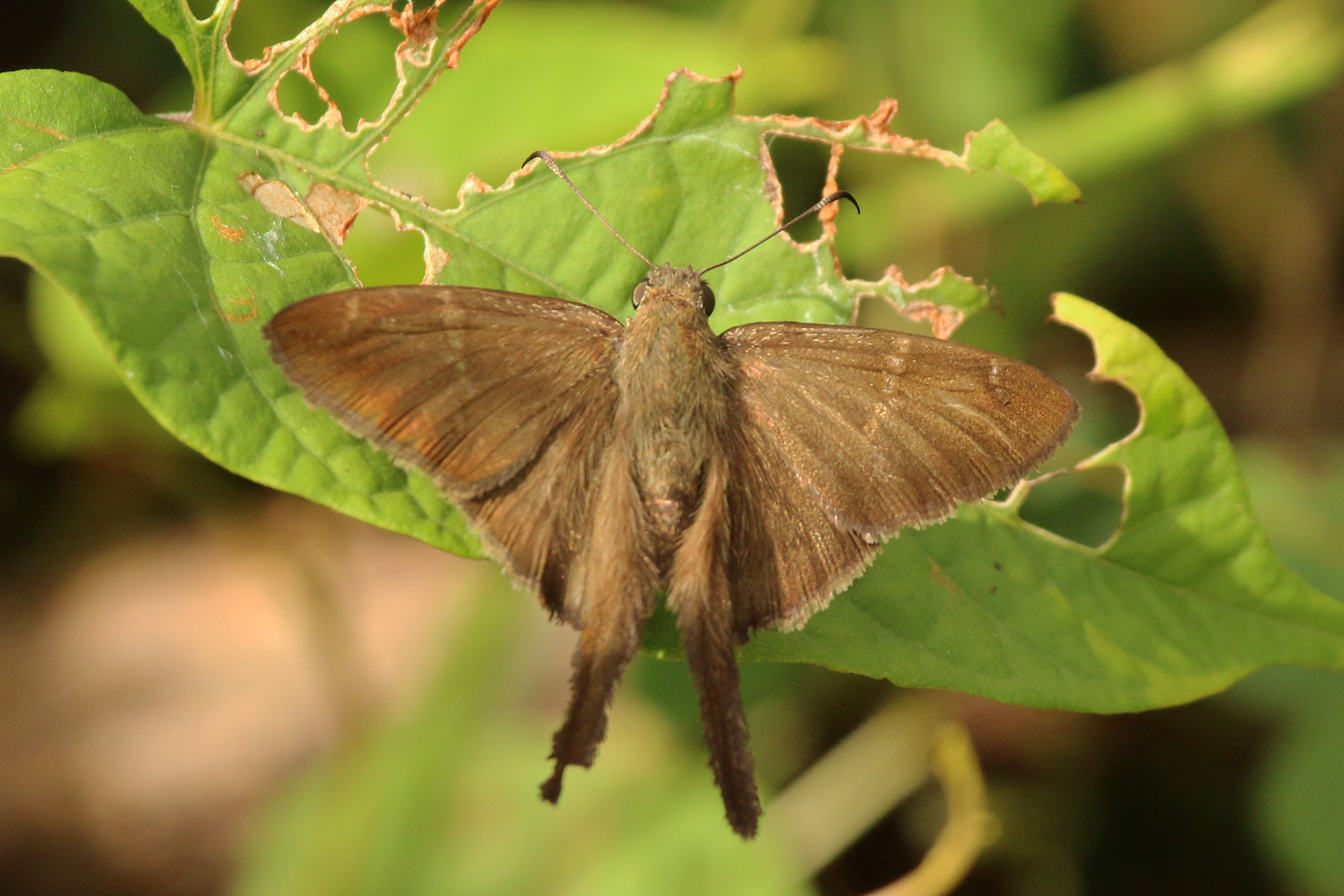
Urbanus simplicius, Tobago

- Eudamus proteus, long-tailed skipper
- Eudamus catillus
- Eudamus dorantes
- Eudamus simplicius
- Eudamus undalatus
- Eudamus eurycles
- Eudamus aminias
- Eudamus octomaculata
- Polites vibex praeceps, whirlabout
- Mysoria venezuelae
- Phanus marshalli
- Celaenorrhinus eligius
- Pellicia bessus
- Pellicia bromias
- Hesperia syrichtus
- Hylephila phyleus, fiery skipper
- Mucia thyia
- Calpodes ethlius
- Prenes nyctelius
- Prenes ocola
- Prenes sylvicola
- Vacerra litana
- Niconiades xanthaphes
- Niconiades gesta
- Mnasitheus simplicissimus
- Megistias telata
- Megistias epiberus
- Megistias cortica
- Carystus fantasos
- Carystus phorcus
- Cymaenes silius pericles
- Epius veleda
- Callimormus corades
- Callimormus juventa
- Thracides antonius
- Perichares corydon
- Ouleus fridericus, Fridericus spreadwing
- Systacea erosa
- Lerodea tripunctata
- Lerodea phocilides
- Rhinthon bistrigula
- Rhinthon cubana orca, orca skipper
- Talides sinon
- Atrytone pericia
- Lerema parum punctata
- Urbanus procne, brown longtail

== Hedylidae ==
The moth butterflies were not recorded.
