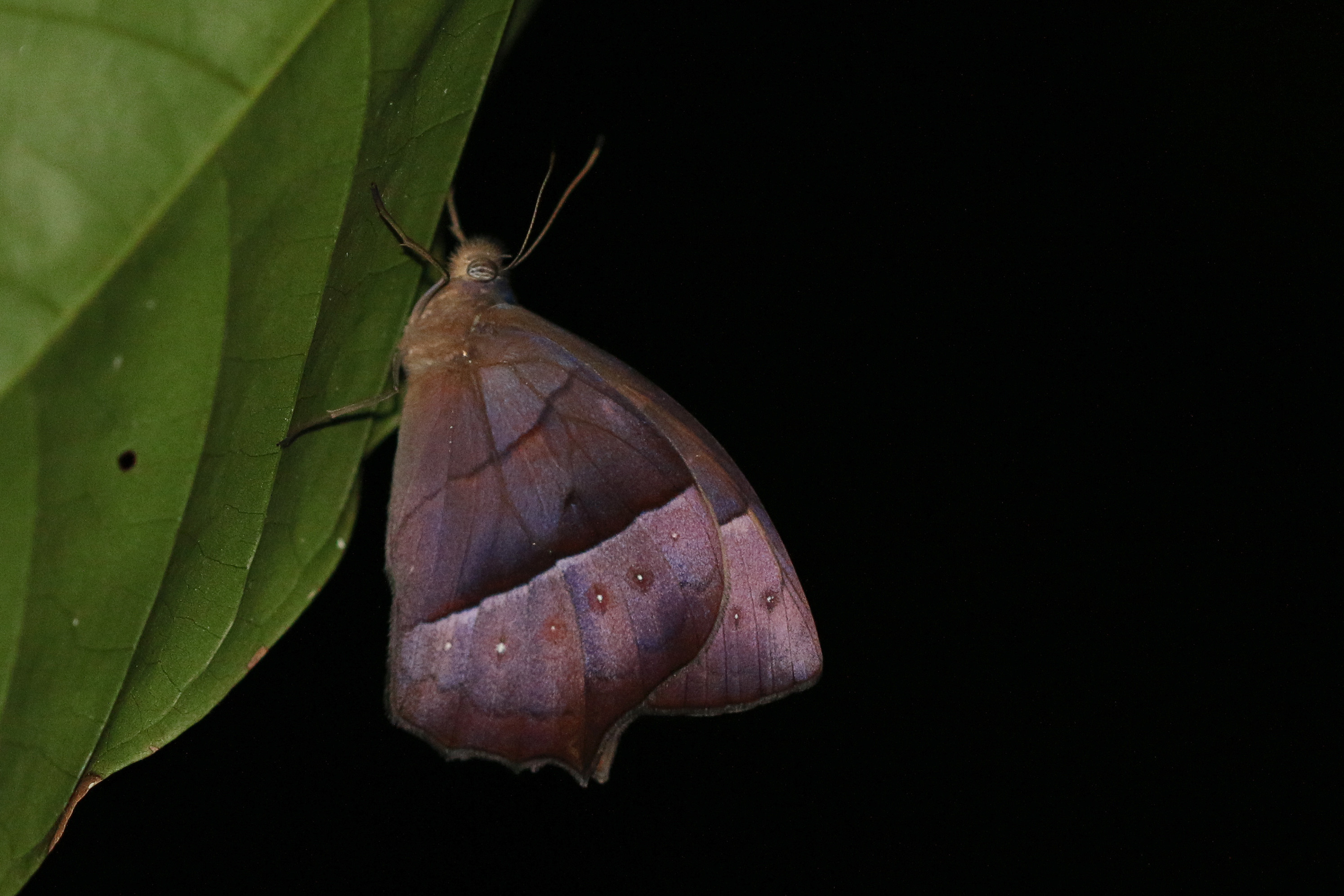
- Taygetis virgilia, Trinidad

Scientific classification
- Kingdom: Animalia
- Phylum: Arthropoda
- Class: Insecta
- Order: Lepidoptera
- Family: Nymphalidae
- Subfamily: Satyrinae
- Tribe: Satyrini
- Subtribe: Euptychiina
- Genus: Taygetis; Hübner, [1819]

= Taygetis =

Genus of butterflies

Taygetis is a genus of satyrid butterflies found in the Neotropical realm.

== Taxonomy and evolution ==
The genus appeared as polyphyletic, with Taygetis kerea and Taygetis weymeri as part of the butterfly genus Taygetina, whereas Taygetis rectifascia and Taygetis ypthima are related to the genus Pseudodebis. Recently, the "Taygetis ypthima species group" was defined, and it includes Taygetis rectifascia, Taygetis ypthima, Taygetis drogoni, and Taygetis fulginia. However, the inclusion of such a species group within the genus Taygetis is unsupported by molecular and karyological data.

== Species ==
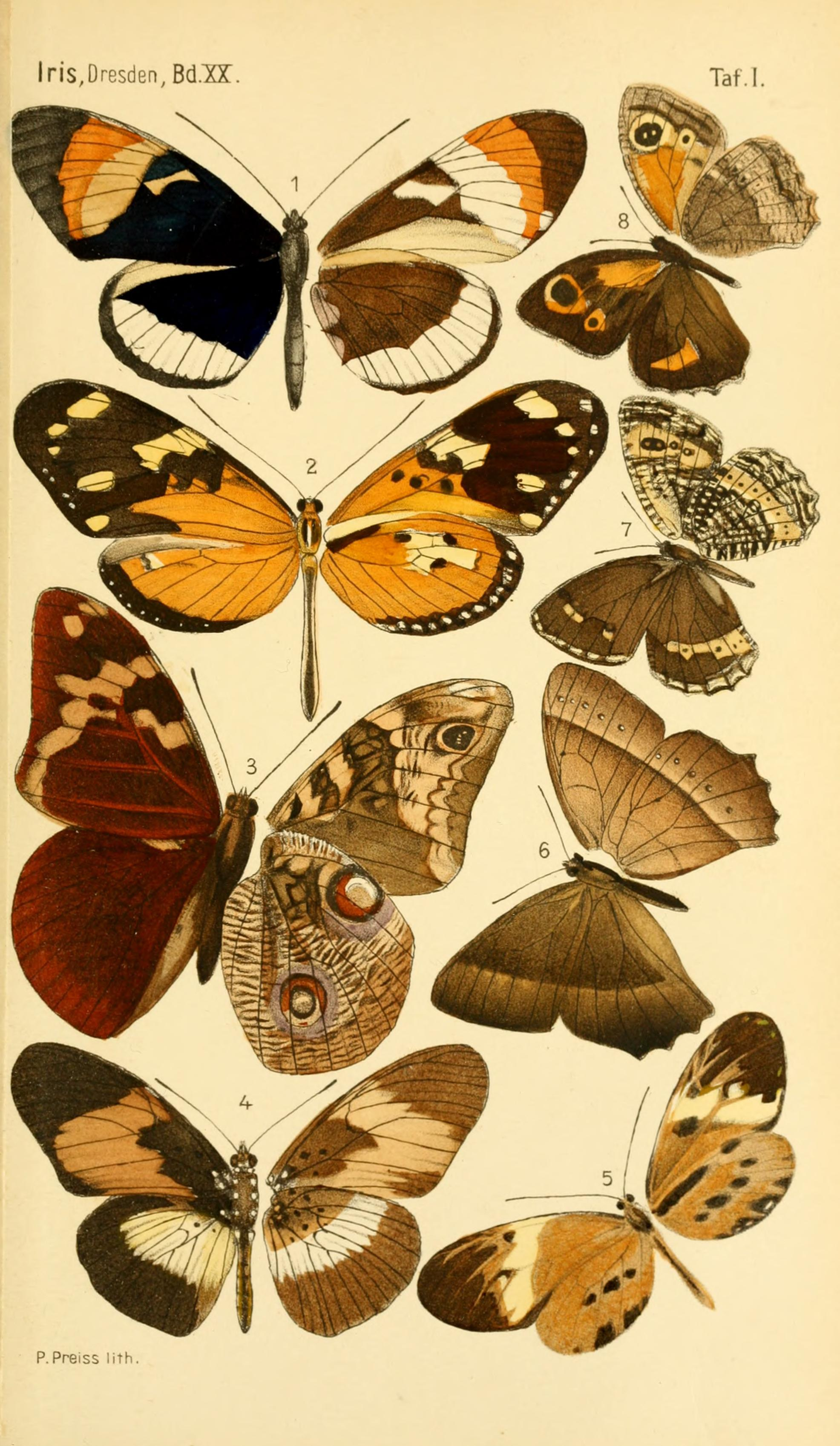
T. tripunctata figure 6

Listed alphabetically:

- Taygetis acuta Weymer, 1910
- Taygetis angulosa Weymer, 1907
- Taygetis asterie Weymer, 1910
- Taygetis chiquitana Forster, 1964
- Taygetis chrysogone Doubleday, [1849]
- Taygetis cleopatra C. & R. Felder, 1862
- Taygetis drogoni Siewert, Zacca, F.M.S. Dias & Freitas, 2013
- Taygetis echo (Cramer, [1775]) - echo satyr
- Taygetis elegia Weymer, 1910
- Taygetis fulginia d’Almeida, 1922
- Taygetis inambari Miller & Lamas, 1999
- Taygetis inconspicua Draudt, 1931
- Taygetis laches (Fabricius, 1793)
- Taygetis larua C. & R. Felder, 1867
- Taygetis leuctra Butler, 1870
- Taygetis mermeria (Cramer, [1776])
- Taygetis oyapock Brévignon, 2007
- Taygetis rectifascia Weymer, 1907
- Taygetis rufomarginata Staudinger, 1888
- Taygetis servius Weymer, 1910
- Taygetis sosis Hopffer, 1874
- Taygetis sylvia Bates, 1866
- Taygetis thamyra (Cramer, [1779])
- Taygetis tripunctata Weymer, 1907
- Taygetis uncinata Weymer, 1907
- Taygetis uzza Butler, 1869
- Taygetis virgilia (Cramer, [1776])
- Taygetis ypthima (Hübner, 1816)
- Taygetis zippora Butler, 1869
