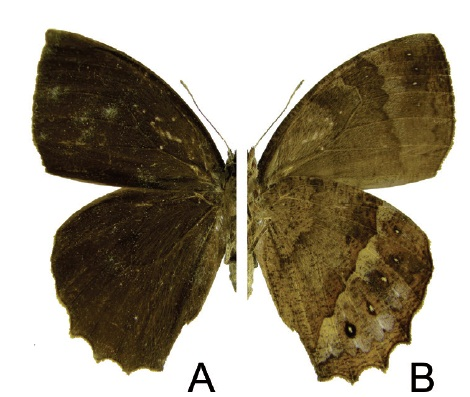
- Male, figure A (dorsal) and B (ventral)
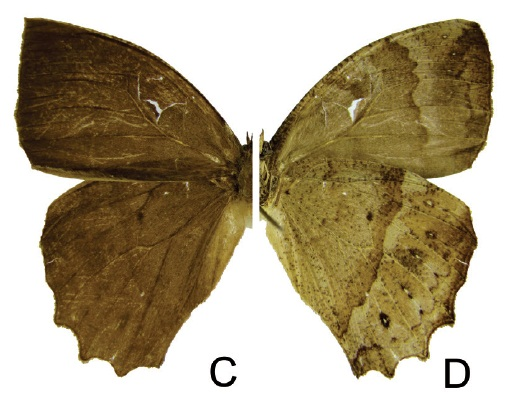
- Female, figure C (dorsal) and D (ventral)

Scientific classification
- Kingdom: Animalia
- Phylum: Arthropoda
- Clade: Pancrustacea
- Class: Insecta
- Order: Lepidoptera
- Family: Nymphalidae
- Genus: Taguaiba
- Species: T. fulginia

Binomial name
- Taguaiba fulginia (d'Almeida, 1922)

Synonyms
- Taygetis fulginia

= Taguaiba fulginia =

Species of butterfly

Taguaiba fulginia is a species of butterfly of the family Nymphalidae. It is found in the southeastern Brazilian states of Minas Gerais, Rio de Janeiro and São Paulo at altitudes ranging from sea level to 250 metres (820 ft).

== Taxonomy ==
The species was previously considered a synonym of Taygetis ypthima, but a morphological study revealed its specific status and indicates closer relationship with Taygetis rectifascia and Taygetis servius. This relationship was confirmed in a molecular phylogenetic study and the species were transferred to genus Taguaiba.
