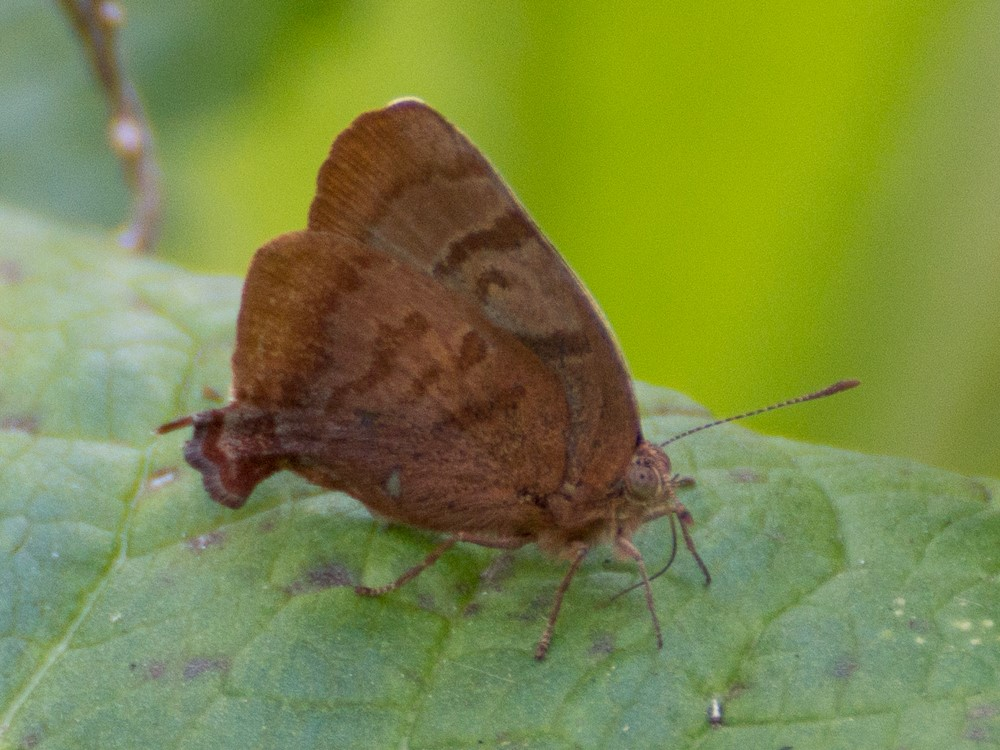

Scientific classification
- Domain: Eukaryota
- Kingdom: Animalia
- Phylum: Arthropoda
- Class: Insecta
- Order: Lepidoptera
- Family: Lycaenidae
- Genus: Rekoa
- Species: R. malina

Binomial name
- Rekoa malina (Hewitson, 1867)

Synonyms
- Thecla malina Hewitson, 1867; Thecla phrynisca Burmeister, 1878

= Rekoa malina =

Species of butterfly

Rekoa malina is a butterfly in the family Lycaenidae. It is found in Brazil and Argentina.
