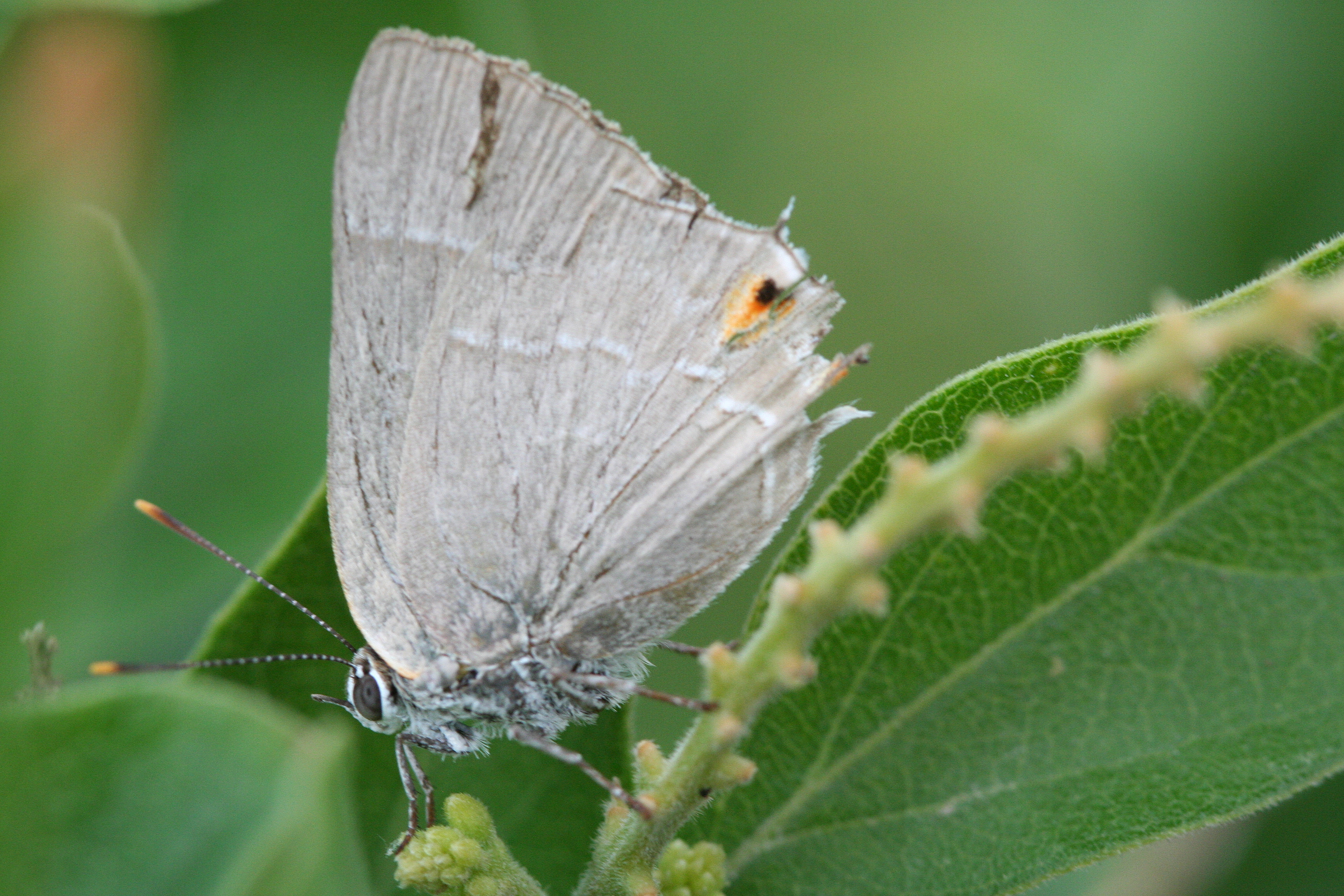

Scientific classification
- Kingdom: Animalia
- Phylum: Arthropoda
- Clade: Pancrustacea
- Class: Insecta
- Order: Lepidoptera
- Family: Lycaenidae
- Genus: Rekoa
- Species: R. marius

Binomial name
- Rekoa marius (Lucas, 1857)

Synonyms
- Thecla marius Lucas, 1857; Thecla aon Lucas, 1857; Thecla spurina Hewitson, 1867; Thecla ericusa Hewitson, 1867; Thecla brescia Hewitson, 1868; Thecla voconia Hewitson, 1869

= Rekoa marius =

Species of butterfly

Rekoa marius, the Marius hairstreak, is a butterfly in the family Lycaenidae. It is found from Paraguay north to Sonora in Mexico. Strays may be found as far north as southern Texas. The species used to be considered rare in the southern Texas. It is the species of Rekoa found in Arizona. The habitat consists of disturbed tropical areas.

The wingspan is 22–32 mm. The upperside of the males is dark iridescent blue. Females are gray. The hindwing has an orange eyespot near the tail. Adults are probably on wing year round in Mexico. In southern Texas, there is one flight with adults on wing from September to December. They feed on flower nectar.

The larvae feed on various plants, including legumes and malpighias.
