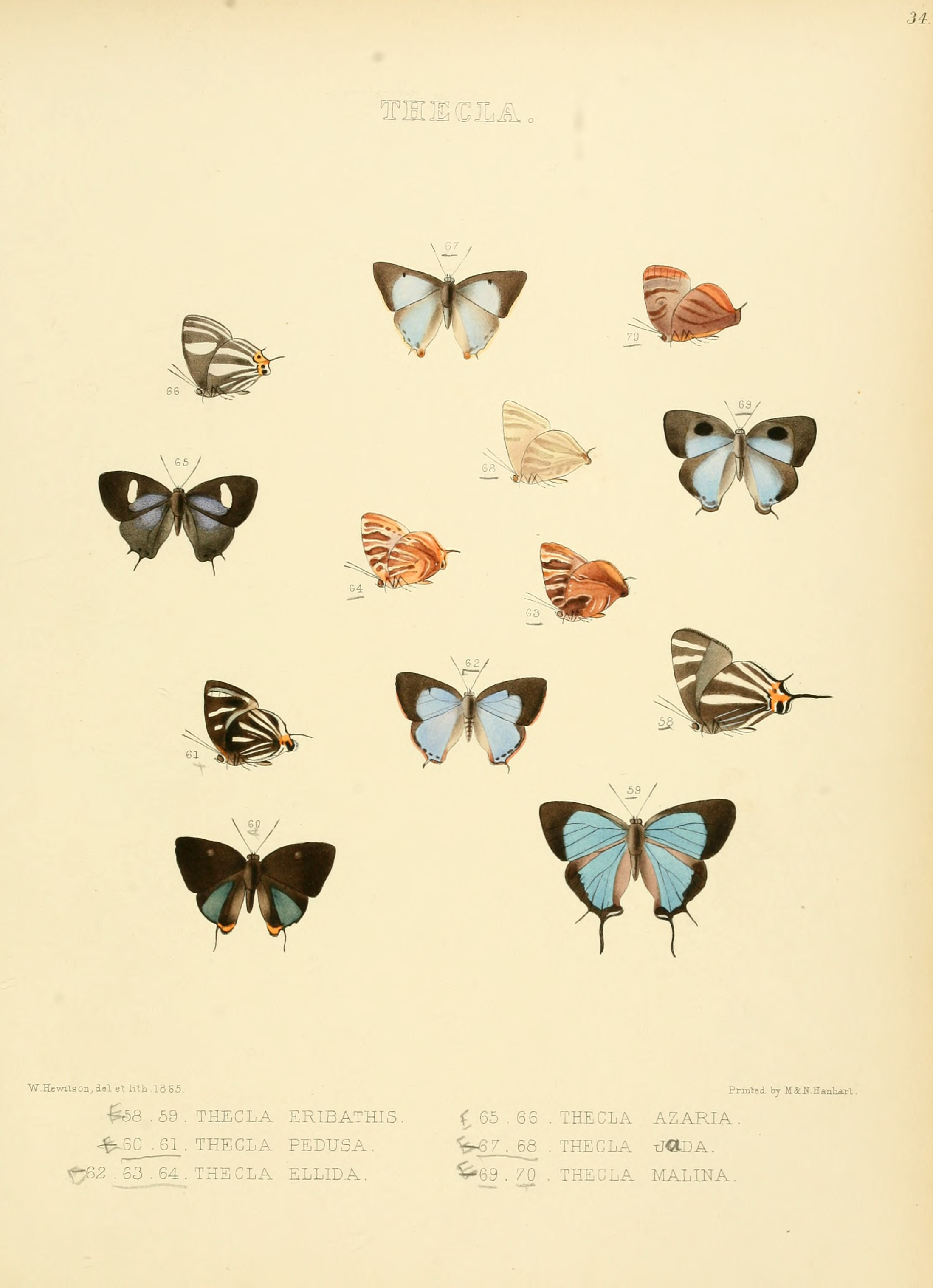
- Rekoa malina, figures 69 and 70

Scientific classification
- Domain: Eukaryota
- Kingdom: Animalia
- Phylum: Arthropoda
- Class: Insecta
- Order: Lepidoptera
- Family: Lycaenidae
- Genus: Rekoa; Kaye, 1904

Synonyms
- Heterosmaitia Clench, 1964

= Rekoa =

Butterfly genus in family Lycaenidae

Rekoa is a genus of butterflies in the family Lycaenidae. The species of this genus are found in the Neotropical realm.

== Species ==
- Rekoa bourkei (Kaye, 1925) - Jamaican hairstreak
- Rekoa malina (Hewitson, 1867)
- Rekoa marius (Lucas, 1857) - Marius hairstreak
- Rekoa meton (Cramer, [1779]) - Meton hairstreak
- Rekoa palegon (Cramer, [1780]) - gold-bordered hairstreak
- Rekoa stagira (Hewitson, 1867) - smudged hairstreak
- Rekoa zebina (Hewitson, 1869) - Zebina hairstreak
