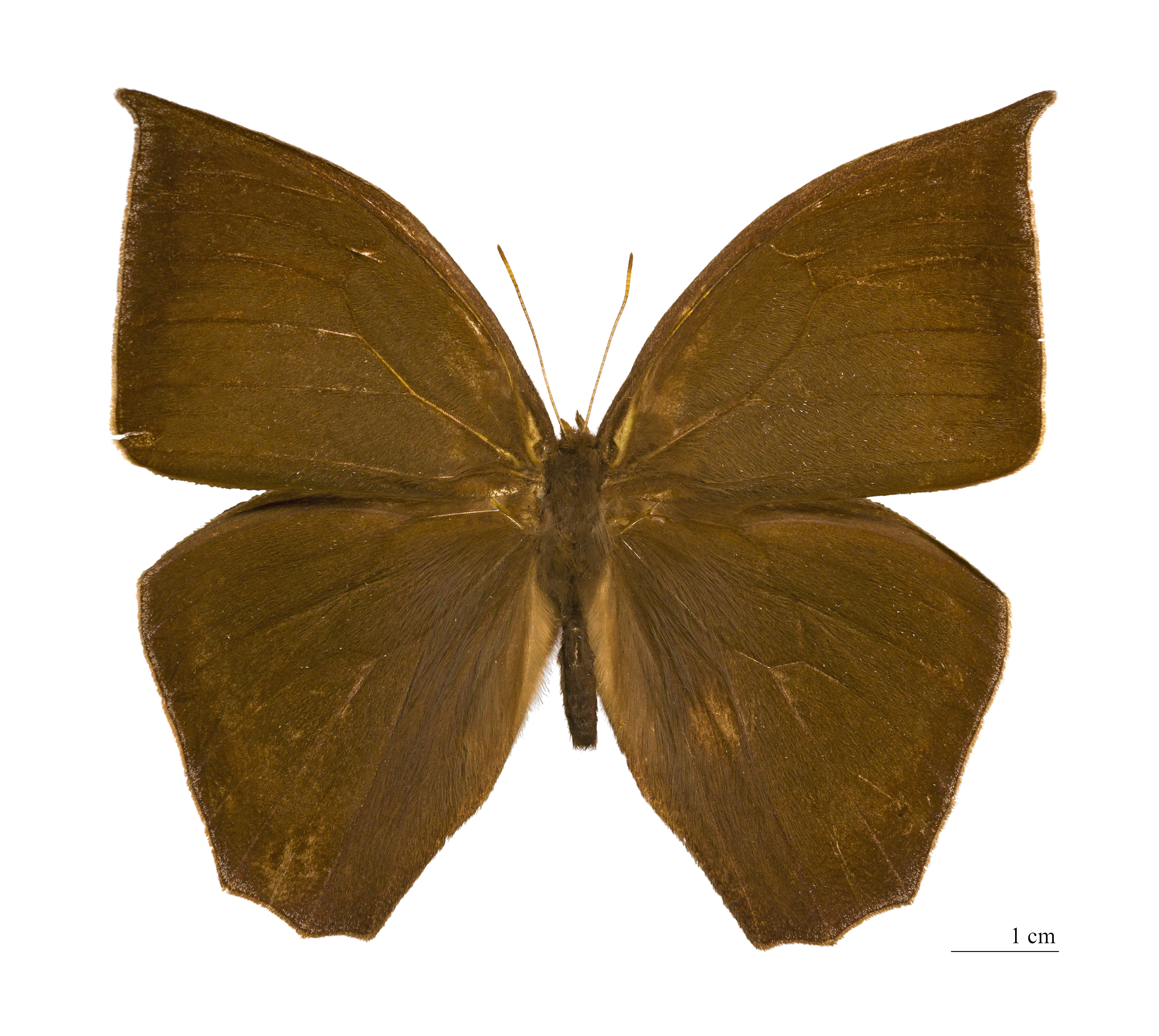
- Dorsal side - MHNT
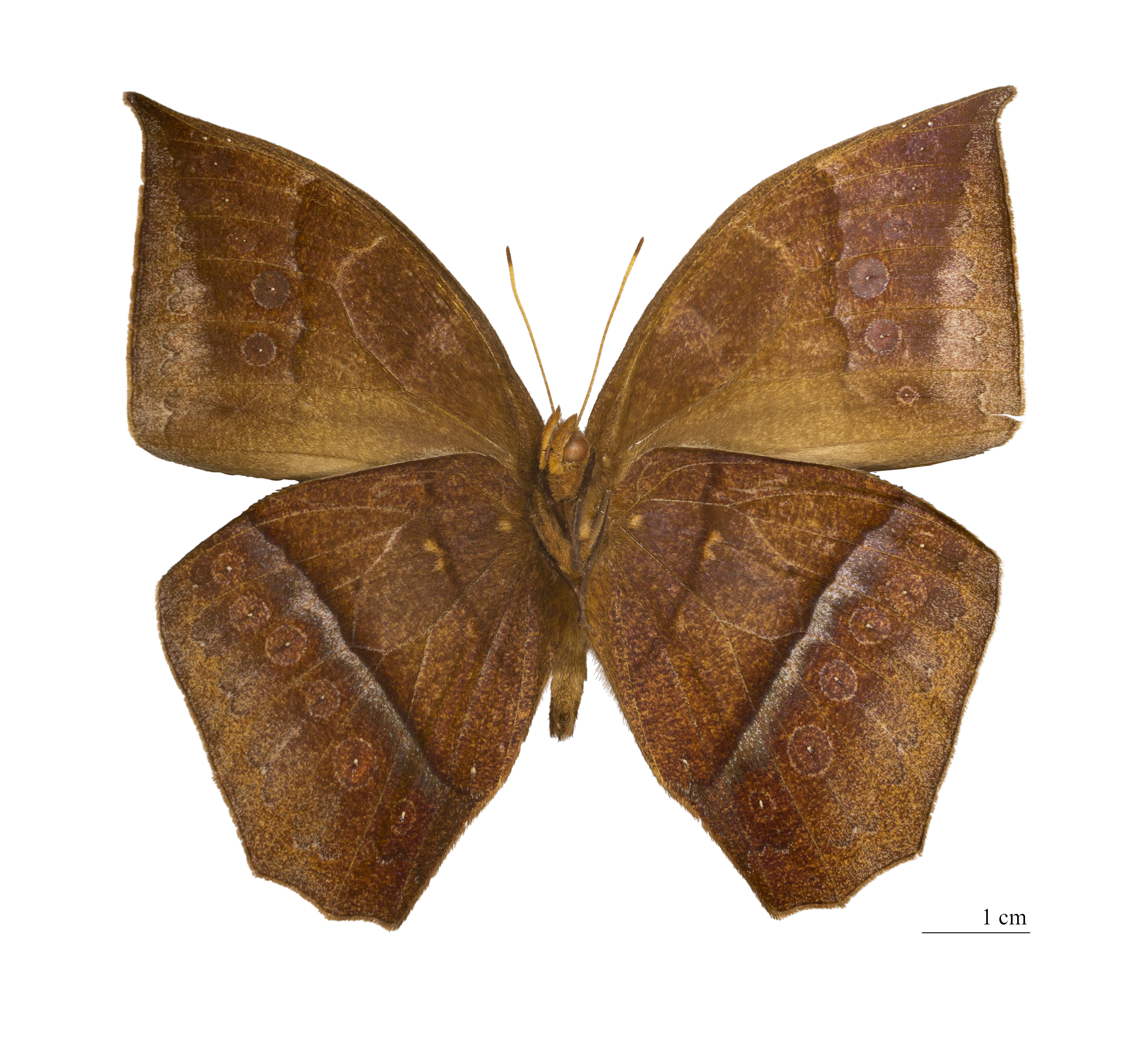
- Ventral side - MHNT

Scientific classification
- Kingdom: Animalia
- Phylum: Arthropoda
- Class: Insecta
- Order: Lepidoptera
- Family: Nymphalidae
- Genus: Taygetis
- Species: T. mermeria

Binomial name
- Taygetis mermeria (Cramer, [1776])

Synonyms
- Papilio mermeria Cramer, [1776]; Faunus tenebrosus Blanchard, [1844]; Taygetis mermeria f. crameri Weymer, 1910; Taygetis excavata Butler, 1868

= Taygetis mermeria =

Species of butterfly

Taygetis mermeria, the mermeria wood nymph, is a species of butterfly of the family Nymphalidae. It is found throughout the Neotropical realm from Mexico to Bolivia. The habitat consists of rainforests and cloudforests.

== Subspecies ==
- Taygetis mermeria mermeria (Suriname, Bolivia, Brazil: Amazonas)
- Taygetis mermeria excavata Butler, 1868 (Costa Rica, Panama, Honduras)
- Taygetis mermeria griseomarginata Miller, 1978 (Mexico)

See also Taygetis mermeria f. crameri Weymer, 1910 [Unknown source, but see Weymer, 1924: 185. (also in german .
