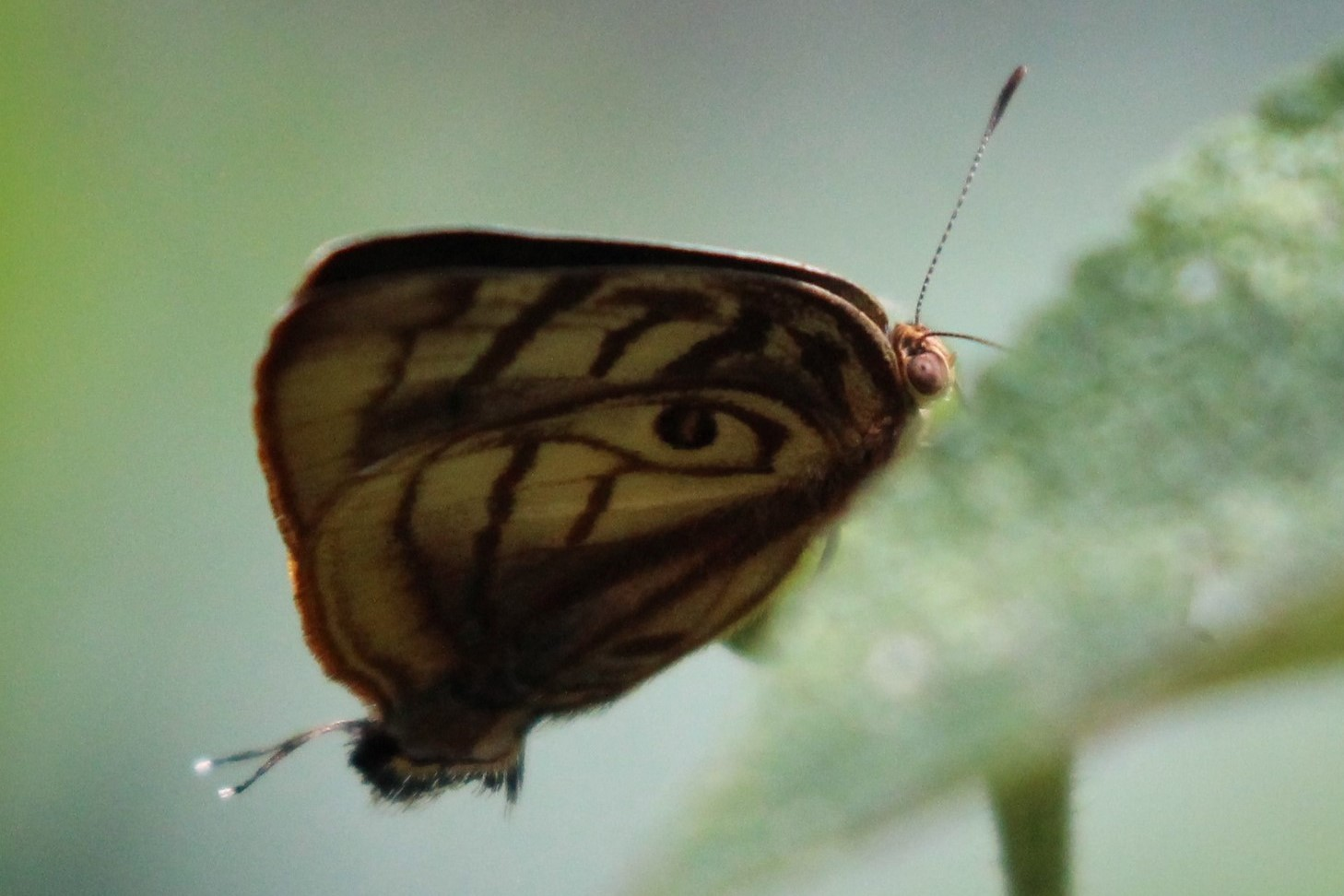

Scientific classification
- Domain: Eukaryota
- Kingdom: Animalia
- Phylum: Arthropoda
- Class: Insecta
- Order: Lepidoptera
- Family: Lycaenidae
- Genus: Rekoa
- Species: R. meton

Binomial name
- Rekoa meton (Cramer, [1779])

Synonyms
- Papilio meton Cramer, [1779]; Hesperia augustus Fabricius, 1793; Mithras metus Hübner, [1819]

= Rekoa meton =

Species of butterfly

Rekoa meton, the Meton hairstreak is a butterfly in the family Lycaenidae. It is found from Mexico to Brazil.
