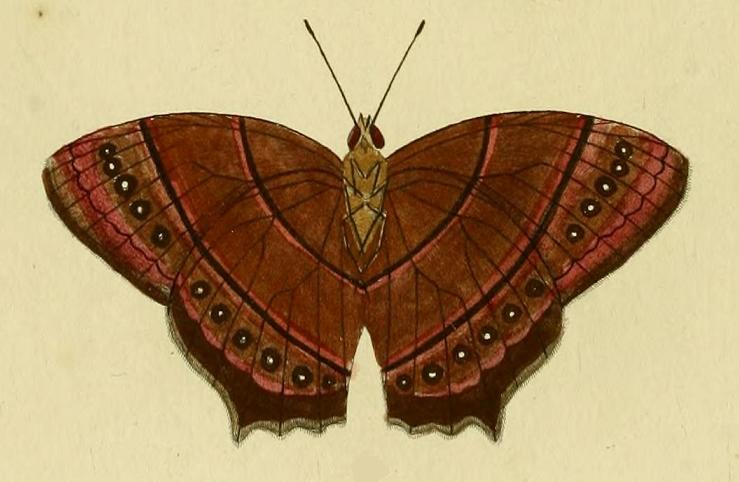

Scientific classification
- Kingdom: Animalia
- Phylum: Arthropoda
- Class: Insecta
- Order: Lepidoptera
- Family: Nymphalidae
- Genus: Taygetis
- Species: T. virgilia

Binomial name
- Taygetis virgilia (Cramer, [1776])

Synonyms
- Papilio virgilia Cramer, [1776]; Papilio rebecca Fabricius, 1793; Taygetis nympha Butler, 1868; Taygetis erubescens Butler, 1868; Taygetis virgilia f. daguana Bargmann, 1928; Taygetis erubescens ab. pseudorufomarginata Bargmann, 1929

= Taygetis virgilia =

Species of butterfly

Taygetis virgilia is a species of butterfly of the family Nymphalidae. It is found from Mexico to Honduras, Colombia, Suriname and Guyana.
