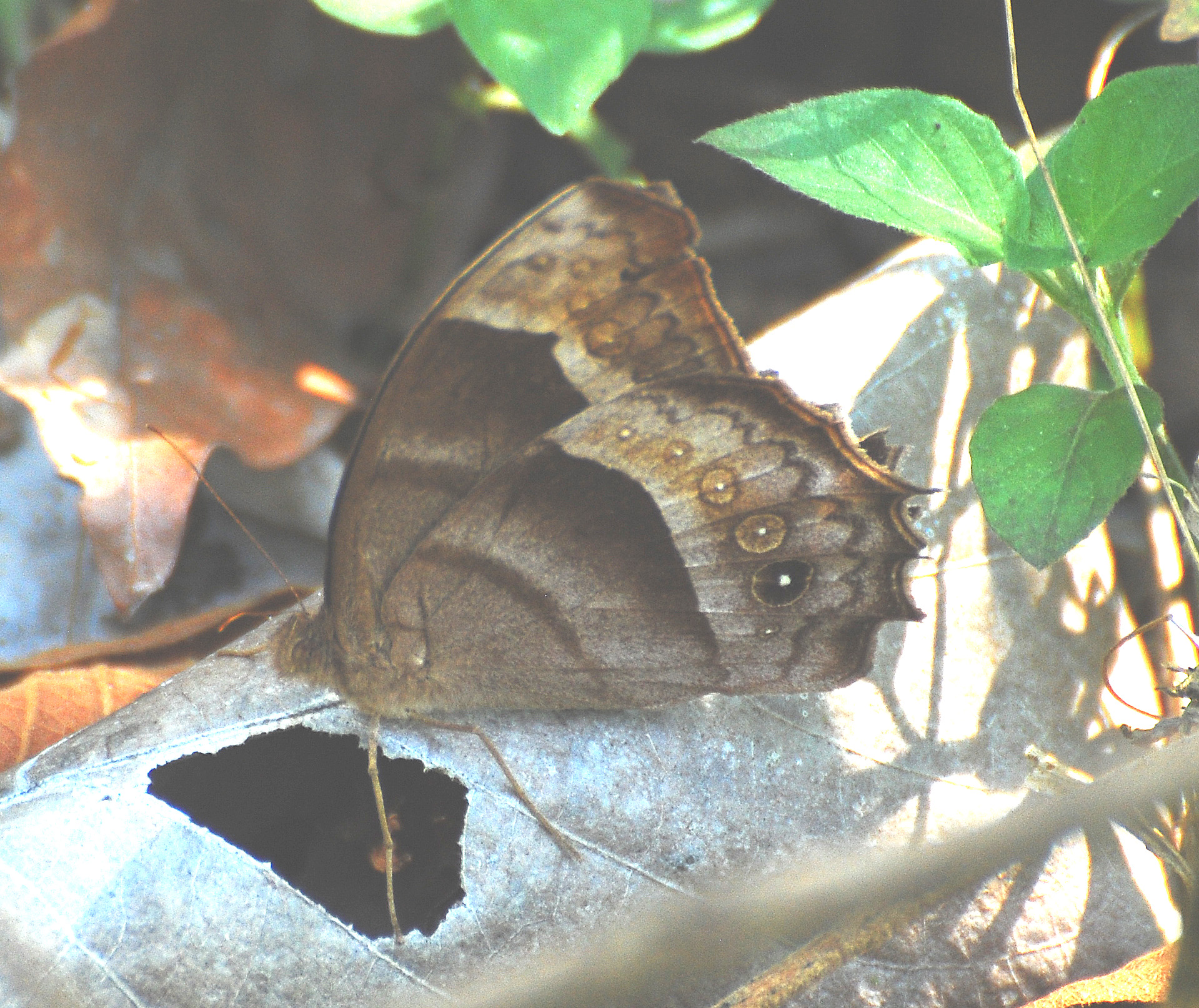

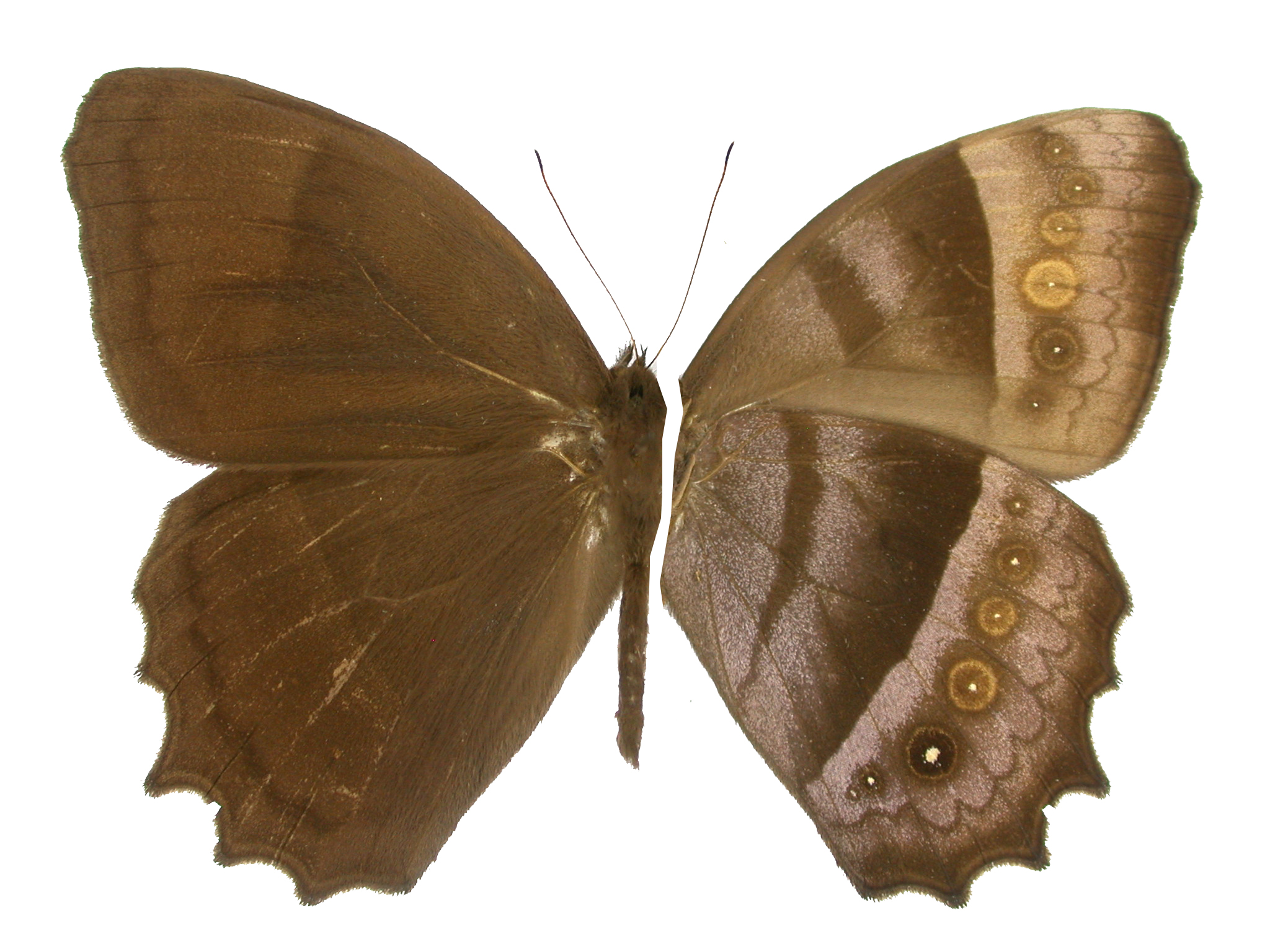

Scientific classification
- Kingdom: Animalia
- Phylum: Arthropoda
- Class: Insecta
- Order: Lepidoptera
- Family: Nymphalidae
- Genus: Taygetis
- Species: T. thamyra

Binomial name
- Taygetis thamyra (Cramer, [1779])

Synonyms
- Papilio thamyra Cramer, [1779]; Taygetis andromeda var. cinerascens Butler, 1877; Taygetis celia f. magna d'Almeida, 1922; Taygetis andromeda f. isis Bargmann, 1928; Taygetis andromeda f. stollei Ribeiro, 1931

= Taygetis thamyra =

Species of butterfly

Taygetis thamyra, the Andromeda satyr, is a species of butterfly in the family Nymphalidae. It is found in Suriname, Colombia, Brazil (Amazonas, Rio de Janeiro, Rondônia) and the Guyanas.
