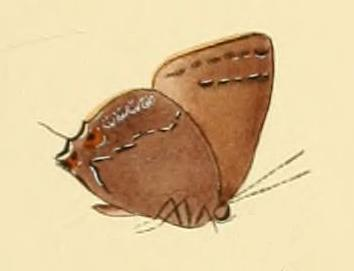

Scientific classification
- Domain: Eukaryota
- Kingdom: Animalia
- Phylum: Arthropoda
- Class: Insecta
- Order: Lepidoptera
- Family: Lycaenidae
- Genus: Rekoa
- Species: R. stagira

Binomial name
- Rekoa stagira (Hewitson, 1867)

Synonyms
- Thecla stagira Hewitson, 1867; Thecla stagira var. erenea Hewitson, 1867; Thecla timaea Hewitson, 1869; Thecla volana Hewitson, 1869; Thecla lydia Kirby, 1871; Thecla thoana Hewitson, 1874; Thecla spurina carioca Ebert, 1965

= Rekoa stagira =

Species of butterfly

Rekoa stagira, the smudged hairstreak or Stagira hairstreak, is a butterfly in the family Lycaenidae. It is found from Mexico south through Central America, including Nicaragua to Brazil.
