= Rekoa bourkei =

Scientific classification
- Domain: Eukaryota
- Kingdom: Animalia
- Phylum: Arthropoda
- Class: Insecta
- Order: Lepidoptera
- Family: Lycaenidae
- Genus: Rekoa
- Species: R. bourkei

Binomial name
- Rekoa bourkei (Kaye, 1925)

Synonyms
- Thecla bourkei Kaye, 1925; Heterosmaitia abeja Johnson & Matusik, 1988

Species of butterfly

Rekoa bourkei, the Jamaican hairstreak or Hispaniolan hairstreak, is a butterfly in the family Lycaenidae. It is found in the Dominican Republic, Jamaica and Trinidad.
