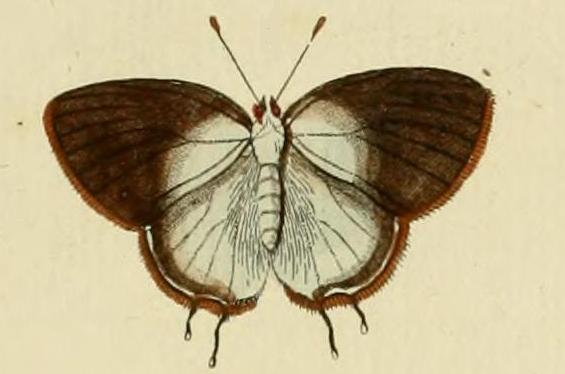

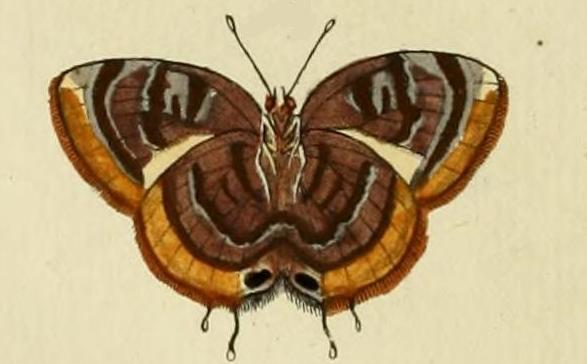

Scientific classification
- Domain: Eukaryota
- Kingdom: Animalia
- Phylum: Arthropoda
- Class: Insecta
- Order: Lepidoptera
- Family: Lycaenidae
- Genus: Rekoa
- Species: R. palegon

Binomial name
- Rekoa palegon (Cramer, [1780])

Synonyms
- Papilio palegon Cramer, [1780]; Papilio myrtillus Stoll, [1781]; Thecla juicha Reakirt, [1867]; Thecla cyrriana Hewitson, 1874; Thecla ulia Dyar, 1913

= Rekoa palegon =

Species of butterfly

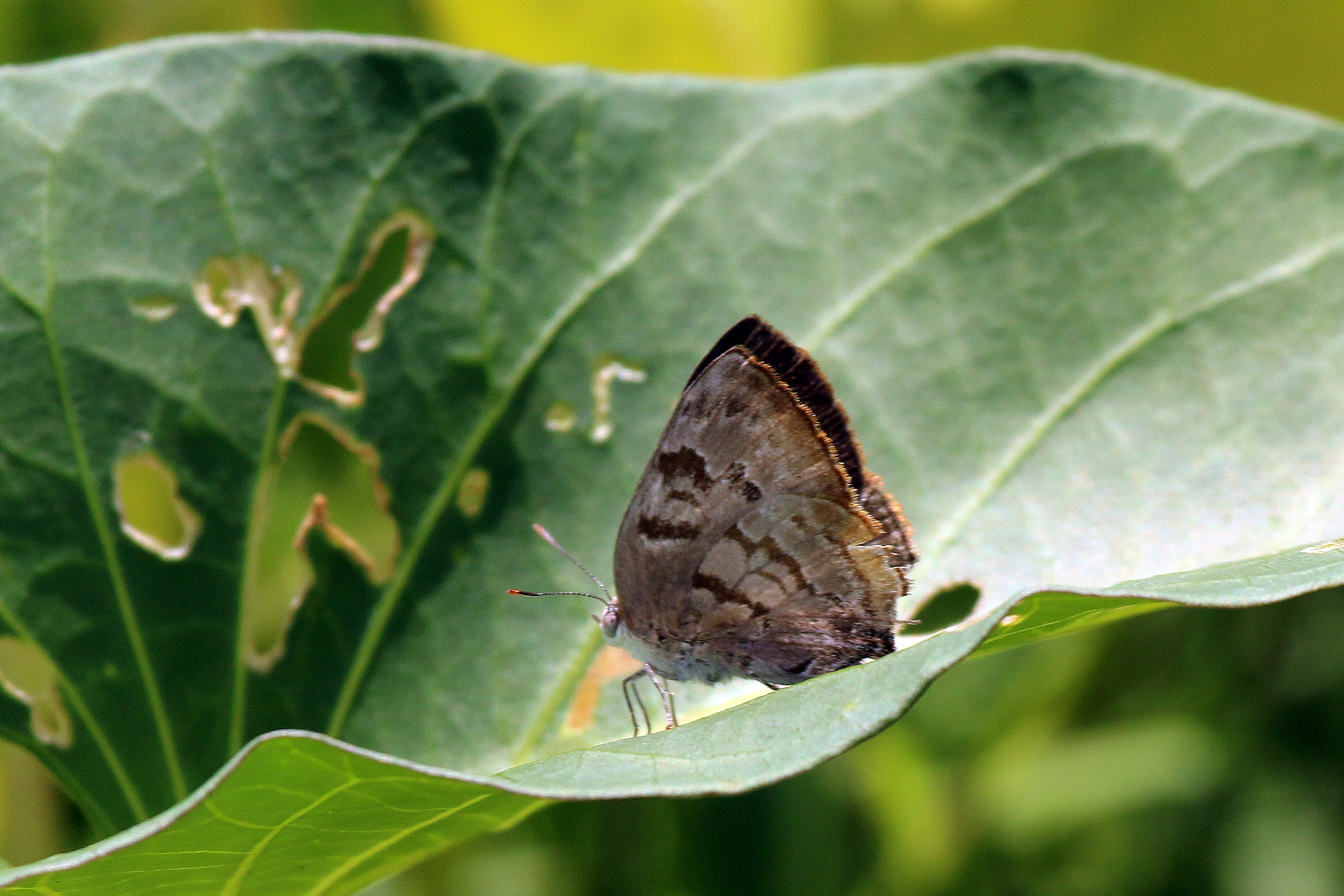
In Tobago

Rekoa palegon, the gold-bordered hairstreak, is a butterfly in the family Lycaenidae. It is found from Argentina north to Mexico and the West Indies. A rare stray has been recorded from southern Texas.

The wingspan is 23–28 mm. There is one generation per year with adults on wing in early November in southern Texas and from May to December in Mexico. They feed on the nectar from flowers of Senecio and Eupatorium species.

The larvae feed on a wide range of plants, including Asteraceae species.

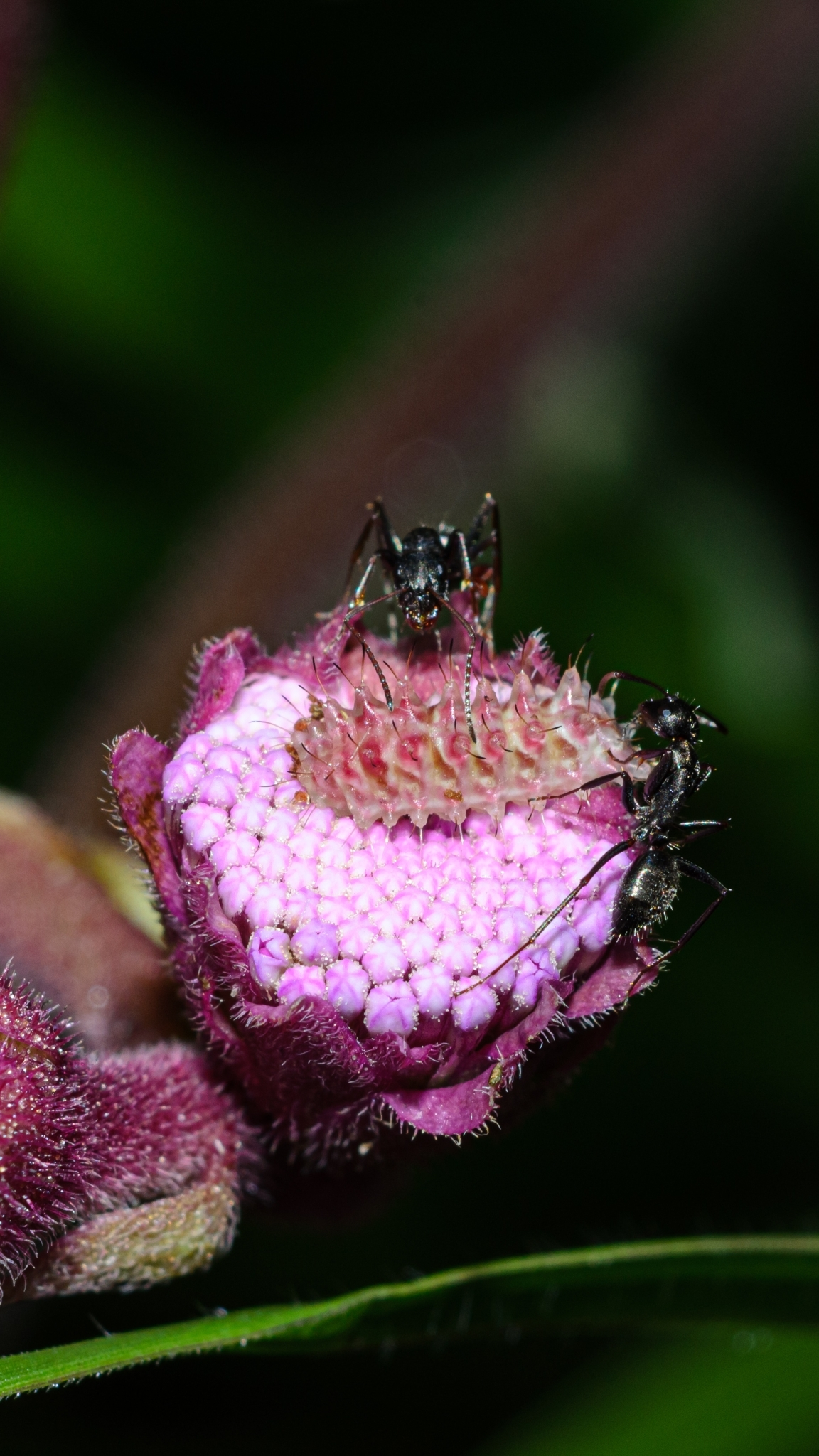
Larval stage in Brazil.
