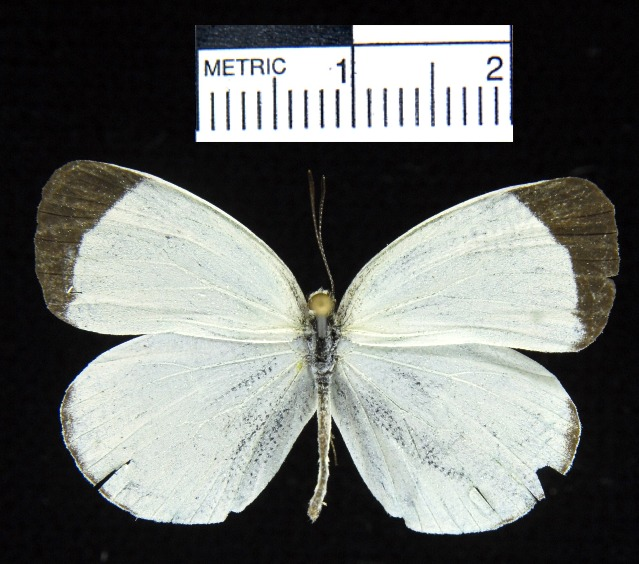
- Dorsal view
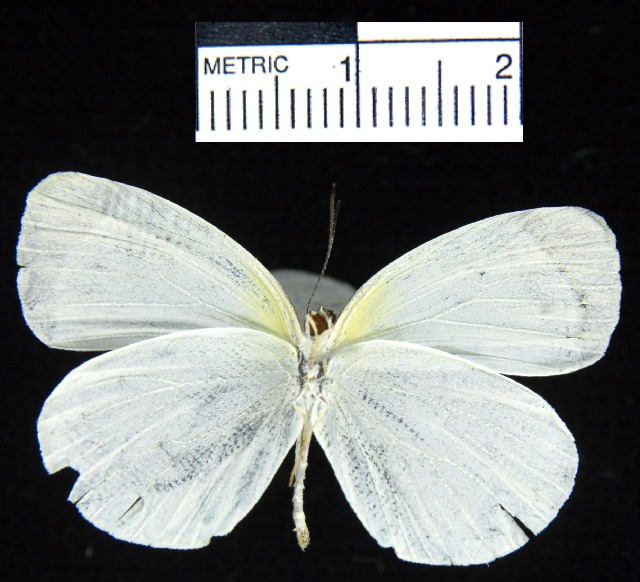
- Ventral view

Scientific classification
- Kingdom: Animalia
- Phylum: Arthropoda
- Class: Insecta
- Order: Lepidoptera
- Family: Pieridae
- Genus: Eurema
- Species: E. albula

Binomial name
- Eurema albula (Cramer, [1776])

Synonyms
- Papilio albula Cramer, [1776]; Terias albula; Papilio cassiae Sepp, [1844] (preocc. Linnaeus, 1758); Terias clara Bates, 1861; Terias tapeina Bates, 1861; Eurema melacheila Möschler, 1877; Pieris sinoe Godart, 1819; Terias marginella C. & R. Felder, 1861; Terias marginula Herrich-Schäffer, 1867 (nom. nud.); Terias celata R. Felder, 1869; Terias leucilla R. Felder, 1869; Eurema albula espinosai Lamas, 1999

= Eurema albula =

Ghost yellow

Species of butterfly

Eurema albula, the ghost yellow, is a butterfly in the family Pieridae. It is found from southern Texas (where it is a rare stray) south through the West Indies and mainland tropical Central and South America to Brazil. The habitat consists of tropical forests and second growth.

The wingspan is 30–50 mm (1.2–2.0 in). Adults are on wing year round in the tropics. They feed on flower nectar.

The larvae feed on Cassia species (including Cassia fruticosa).

== Subspecies ==
- E. a. albula (Surinam, Brazil: Amazonas, Pará)
- E. a. sinoe (Godart, 1819) (Brazil)
- E. a. marginella (C. & R. Felder, 1861) (Venezuela)
- E. a. celata (R. Felder, 1869) (Mexico)
- E. a. espinosae (Fernández, 1928) (Peru)
- E. a. totora Lamas, 1981 (Peru)
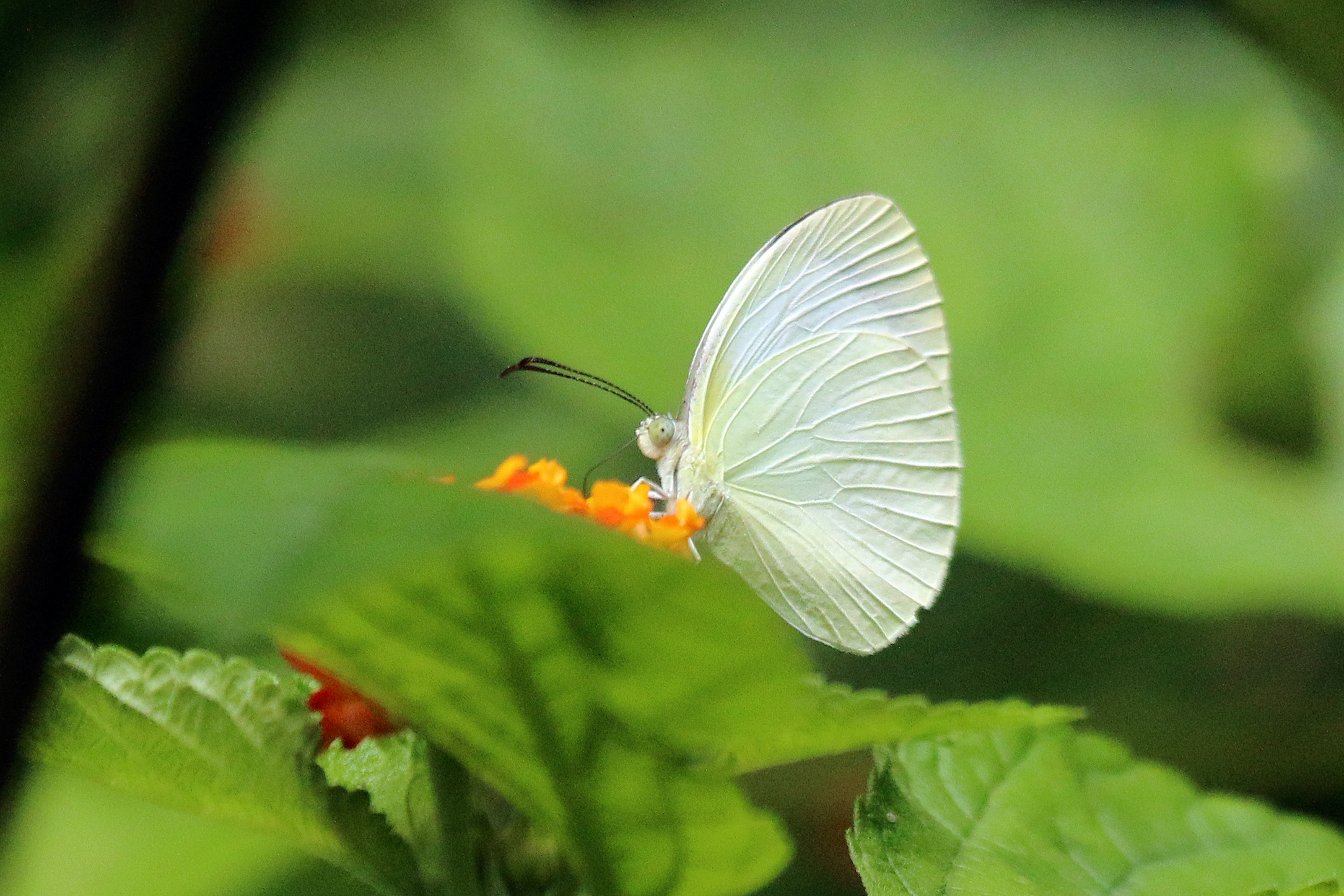
Male, Trinidad

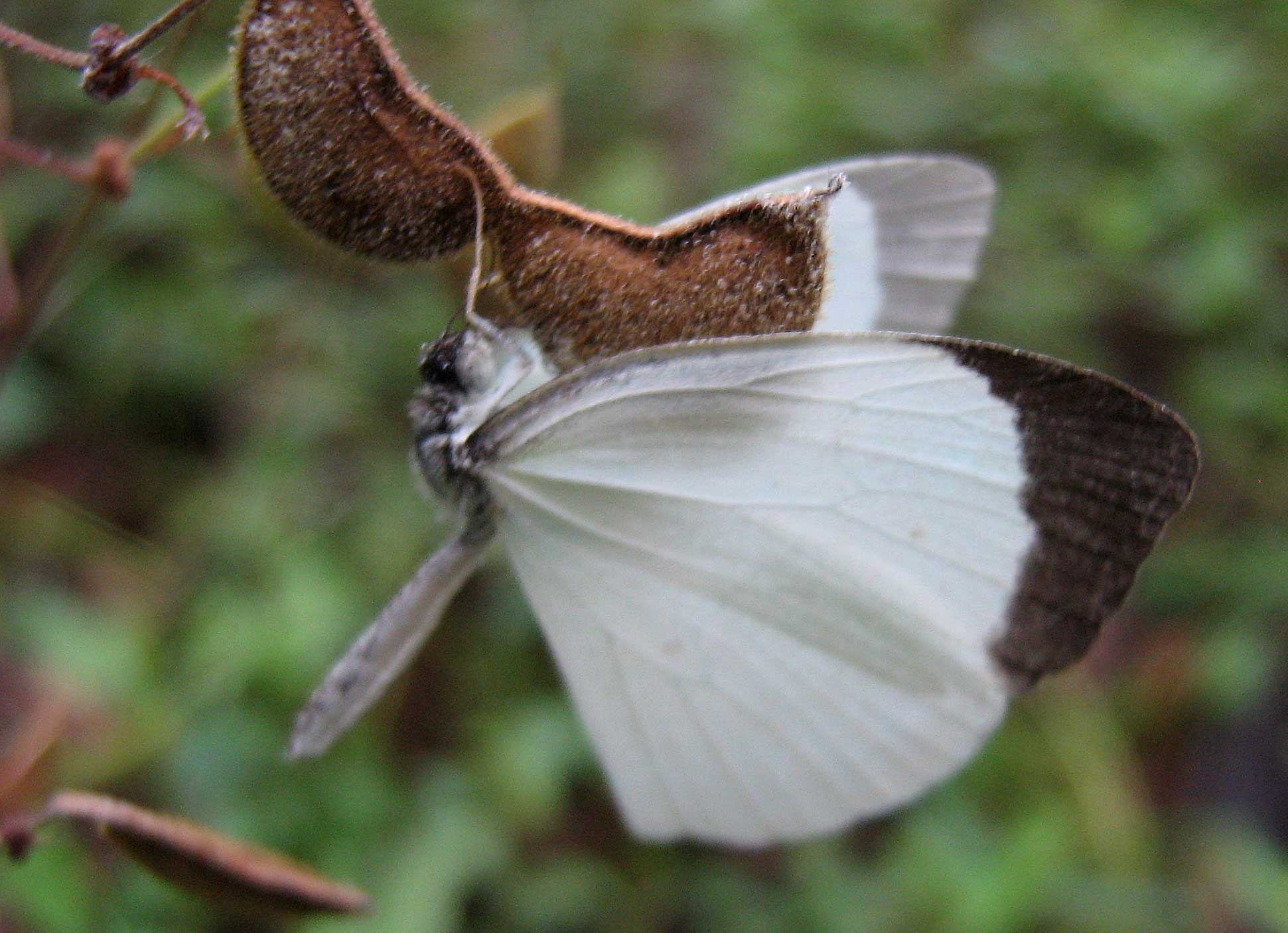
Caught in Desmodium axillare pods
