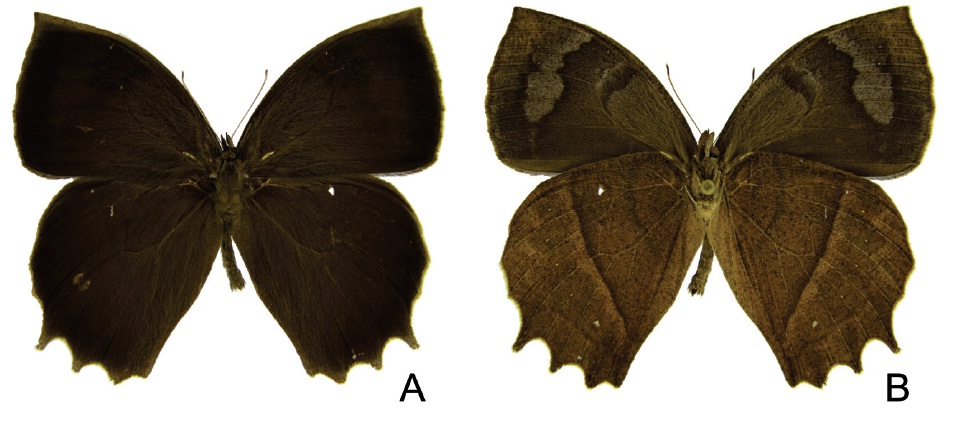
- Male, figure A (dorsal) and B (ventral)
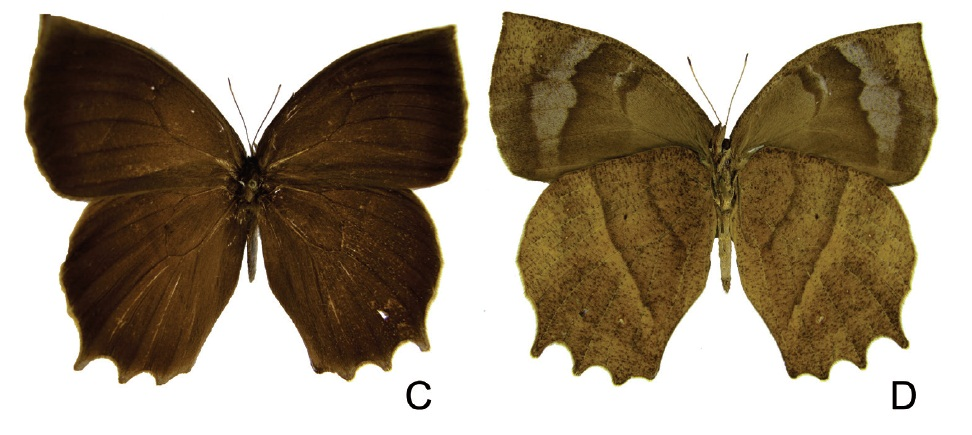
- Female, figure C (dorsal) and D (ventral)

Scientific classification
- Kingdom: Animalia
- Phylum: Arthropoda
- Clade: Pancrustacea
- Class: Insecta
- Order: Lepidoptera
- Family: Nymphalidae
- Genus: Taguaiba
- Species: T. drogoni

Binomial name
- Taguaiba drogoni (Siewert, Zacca, Dias & Freitas, 2013)

Synonyms
- Taygetis drogoni

= Taguaiba drogoni =

Species of butterfly

Taguaiba drogoni is a species of butterfly of the family Nymphalidae. It is found in south-eastern Brazil in the states of Minas Gerais and São Paulo, at altitudes ranging from 800 to 1,500 meters.

The wingspan is 34.5–37 mm.

== Etymology ==
The species name refers to Drogon, one of the three dragons of Daenerys Targaryen, a fictional character from the George R. R. Martin's novel A Song of Ice and Fire.
