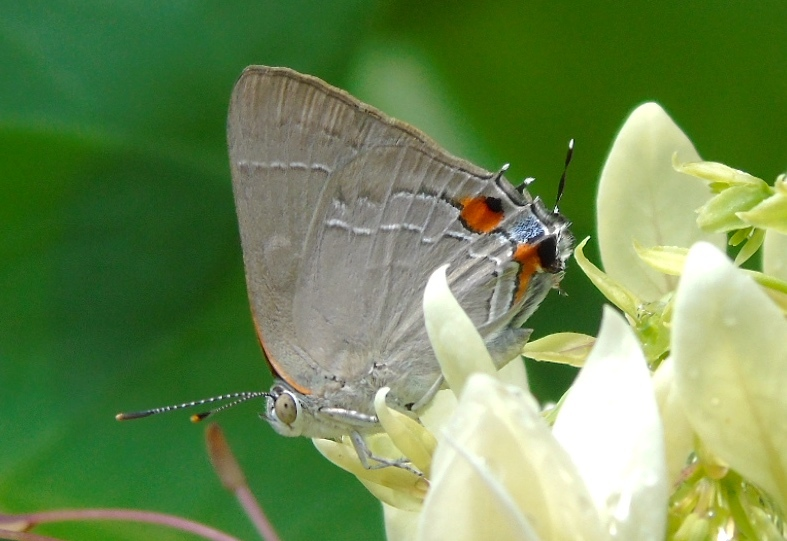

Scientific classification
- Kingdom: Animalia
- Phylum: Arthropoda
- Clade: Pancrustacea
- Class: Insecta
- Order: Lepidoptera
- Family: Lycaenidae
- Genus: Rekoa
- Species: R. zebina

Binomial name
- Rekoa zebina (Hewitson, 1869)

Synonyms
- Thecla zebina Hewitson, 1869; Thecla orses Godman & Salvin, [1887]; Thecla guadala Schaus, 1902

= Rekoa zebina =

Species of butterfly

Rekoa zebina, the Zebina hairstreak is a butterfly in the family Lycaenidae. It is found in Nicaragua, Guatemala and Mexico.
