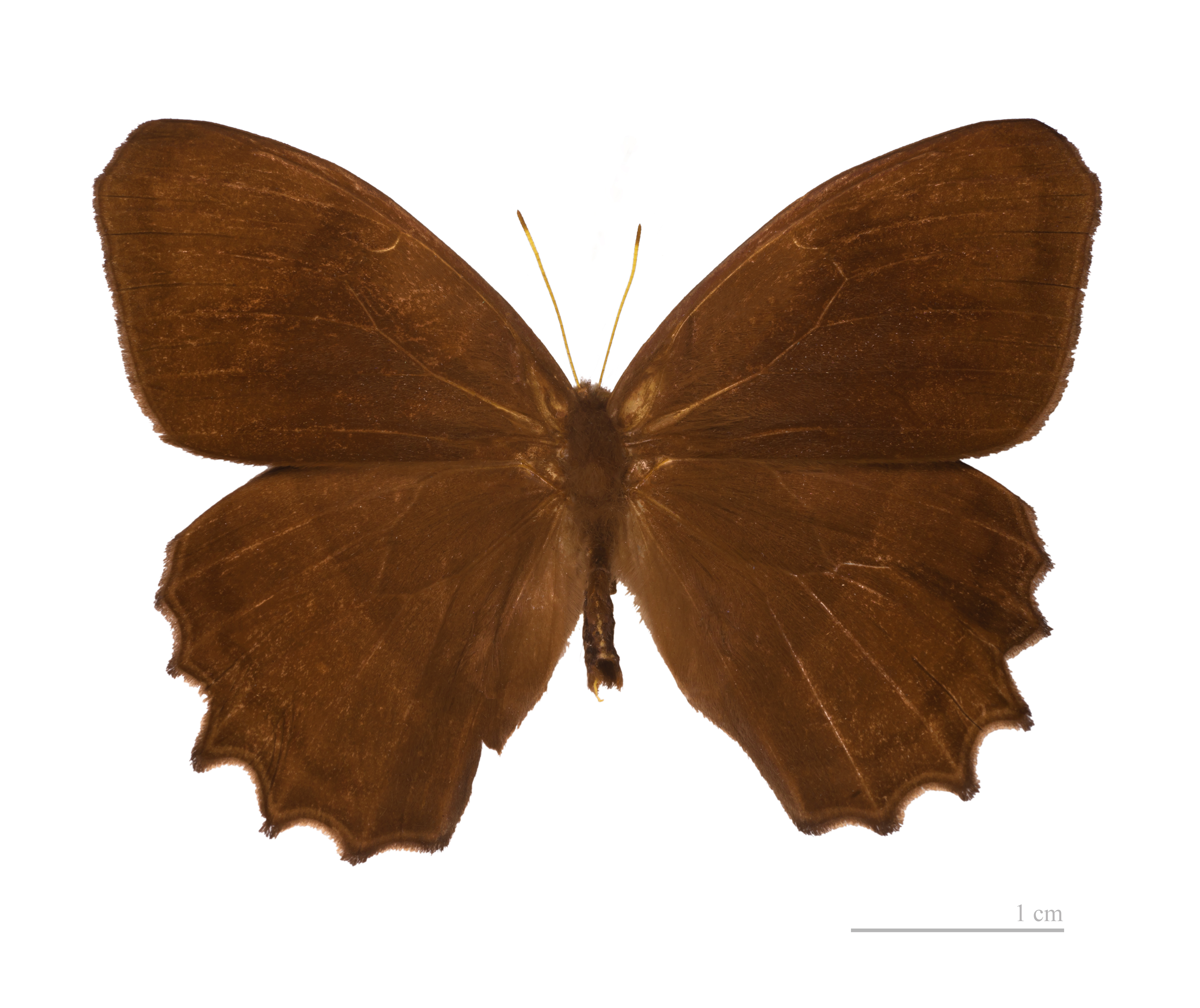
- Dorsal side - MHNT
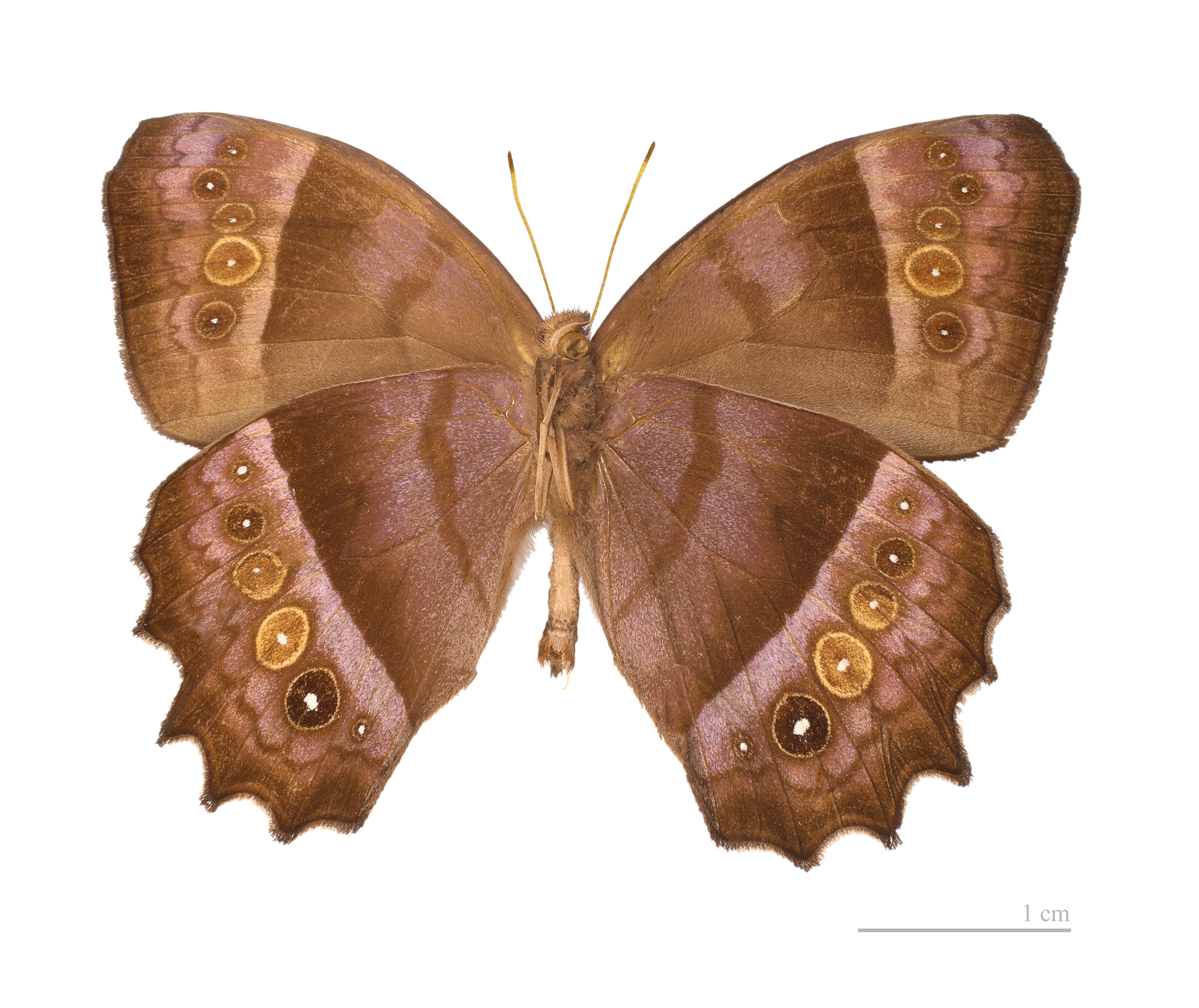
- Ventral side - MHNT

Scientific classification
- Kingdom: Animalia
- Phylum: Arthropoda
- Class: Insecta
- Order: Lepidoptera
- Family: Nymphalidae
- Genus: Taygetis
- Species: T. laches

Binomial name
- Taygetis laches (Fabricius, 1793)

Synonyms
- Papilio laches Fabricius, 1793; Papilio andromeda Cramer, [1776] (preocc.); Taygetis fatua Hübner, [1819]; Taygetis marginata Staudinger, 1887

= Taygetis laches =

Species of butterfly

Taygetis laches is a species of butterfly of the family Nymphalidae. It is found from Mexico to northern Argentina.

The larvae feed on Olyra, Acroceras and Panicum species.

== Subspecies ==
- Taygetis laches laches (Guyana, Suriname)
- Taygetis laches marginata Staudinger, [1887] (Brazil: São Paulo)
- Taygetis laches isis Bargmann, 1928
