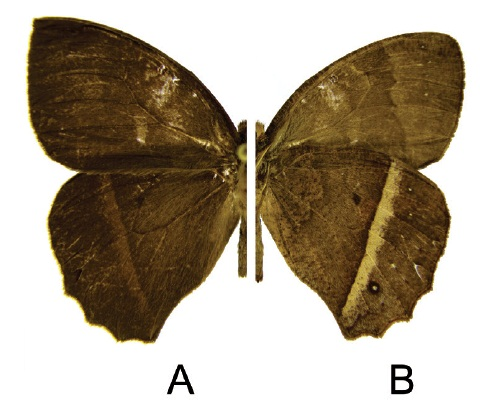
- Male, figure A (dorsal) and B (ventral)
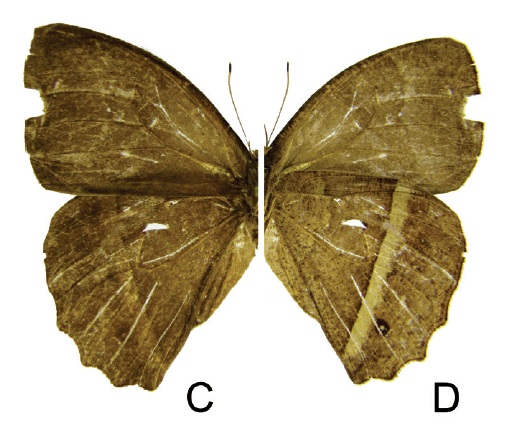
- Female, figure C (dorsal) and D (ventral)

Scientific classification
- Kingdom: Animalia
- Phylum: Arthropoda
- Clade: Pancrustacea
- Class: Insecta
- Order: Lepidoptera
- Family: Nymphalidae
- Genus: Taguaiba
- Species: T. servius

Binomial name
- Taguaiba servius ( Weymer, 1910)

Synonyms
- Taygetis rectifascia; Taygetis rectifascia f. servius Weymer, 1910

= Taguaiba servius =

Species of butterfly

Taguaiba servius is a species of butterfly of the family Nymphalidae. It is found in Brazil, where it has been recorded from Baixo Guandu in Espírito Santo and from Jitaúna in Bahia. It is probably also present in Minas Gerais.
