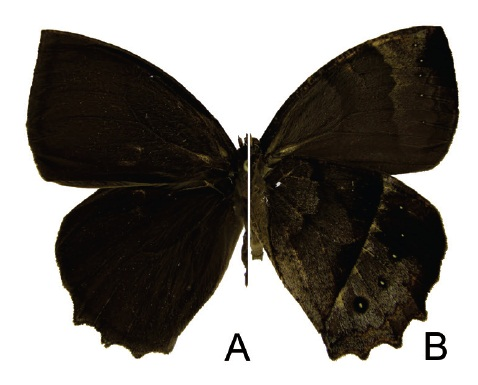
- Male, figure A (dorsal) and B (ventral)
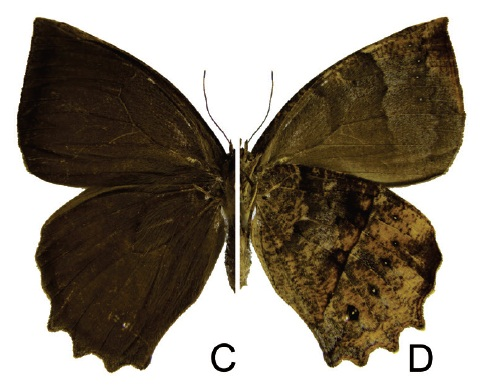
- Female, figure C (dorsal) and D (ventral)

Scientific classification
- Kingdom: Animalia
- Phylum: Arthropoda
- Clade: Pancrustacea
- Class: Insecta
- Order: Lepidoptera
- Family: Nymphalidae
- Genus: Taguaiba
- Species: T. rectifascia

Binomial name
- Taguaiba rectifascia (Weymer, 1907)

Synonyms
- Taygetis rectifascia; Taygetis rectifascia ab. stigma Weymer, 1907; Taygetis rectifascia ab. latifascia Weymer, 1907; Taygetis epithyma Forster, 1964

= Taguaiba rectifascia =

Species of butterfly

Taguaiba rectifascia is a species of butterfly of the family Nymphalidae. It is found in the southeastern and southern Brazilian states of Rio de Janeiro, São Paulo, Paraná and Santa Catarina at altitudes ranging from 300 to 1,200 meters. It has also been found in other southeastern states of Brazil as well as in south western Ecuador.

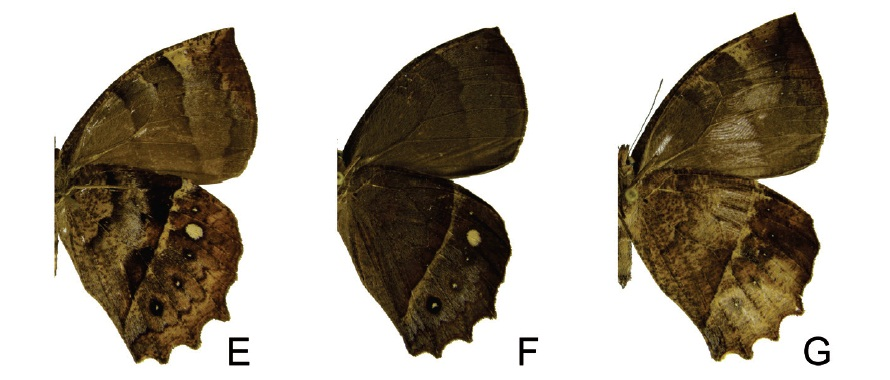
Variations in adults

Adults have been recorded year round.
