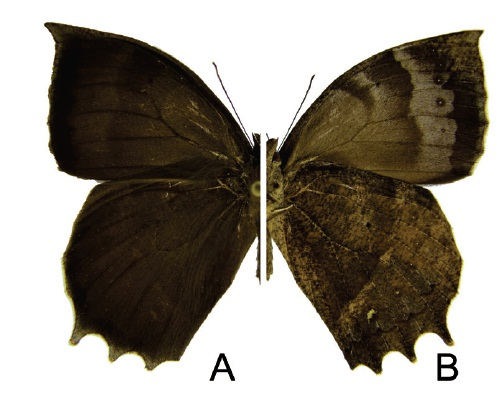
- Male, figure A (dorsal) and B (ventral)
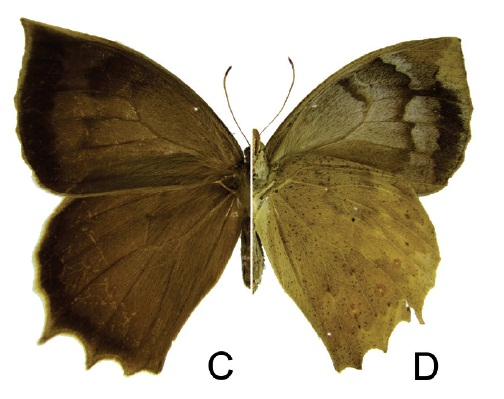
- Female, figure C (dorsal) and D (ventral)

Scientific classification
- Kingdom: Animalia
- Phylum: Arthropoda
- Clade: Pancrustacea
- Class: Insecta
- Order: Lepidoptera
- Family: Nymphalidae
- Genus: Taguaiba
- Species: T. ypthima

Binomial name
- Taguaiba ypthima Hübner, [1821]

Synonyms
- Taygetis ypthima Hübner, [1821; Taygetis xantippe Butler, [1870]; Taygetis ophelia Butler, 1870; Taygetis ypthima f. semibrunnea Weymer, 1910; Taygetis yphtima ab. lineata Kivirikko, 1936

= Taguaiba ypthima =

Species of butterfly

Taguaiba ypthima is a species of butterfly of the family Nymphalidae. It is found in northeastern, southeastern and southern Brazil, Paraguay and Argentina at altitudes ranging from sea level to 2,000 metres (6,600 ft).

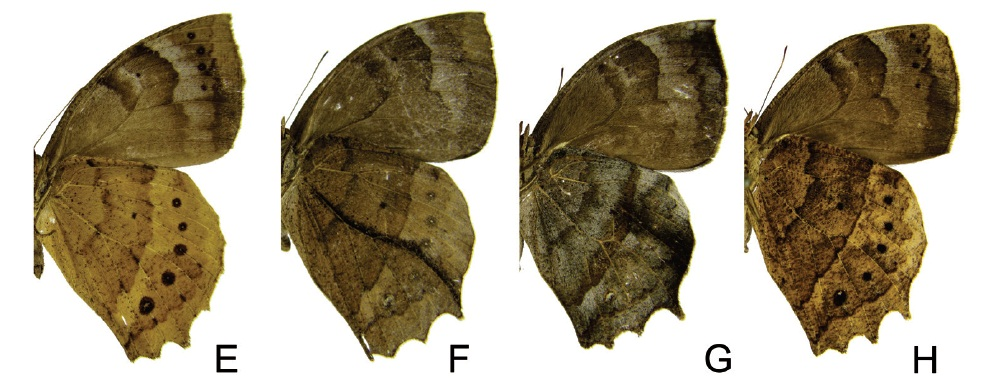
Variations in adults

Adults have been recorded year round.
