= List of species and habitats of principal importance in England =

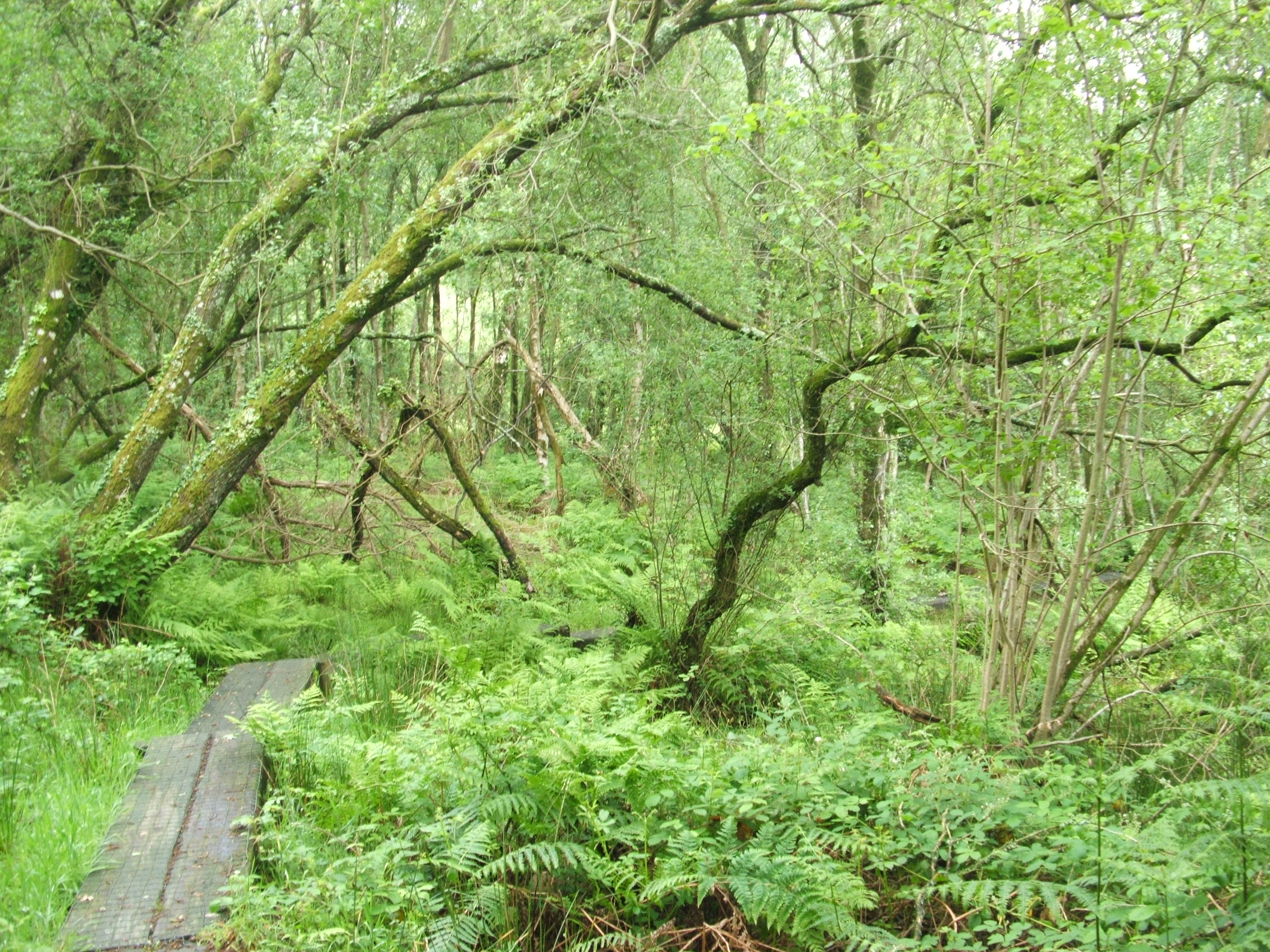
Wet woodland - one of 56 habitats of principal importance for conservation of biodiversity in England. (Firebeacon, Devon)

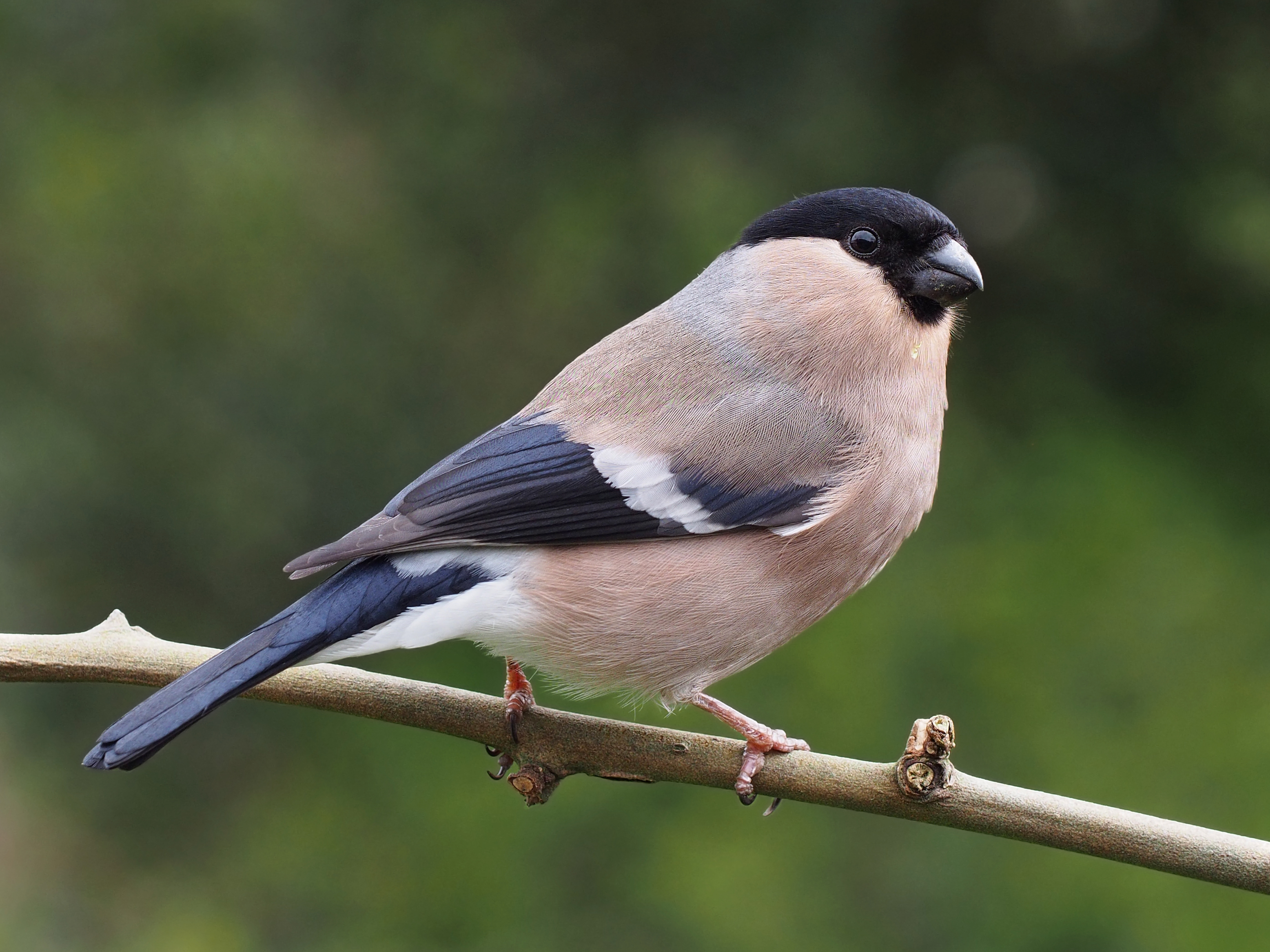
Female bullfinch - one of 943 species of principal importance for the conservation of biodiversity in England

England is obliged by UK law to maintain lists of species and habitats of principal importance for biodiversity conservation; the other countries within the UK: Wales, Scotland and Northern Ireland, have their own laws for this purpose. Public bodies, including local authorities now have a legal duty to have regard to conserving biodiversity in the exercise of their normal functions. In England, this obligation derives from the Natural Environment and Rural Communities (NERC) Act 2006.

== Selection ==
The species that have been designated to be of "principal importance for the purpose of conserving biodiversity" are those that are most threatened, in greatest decline, or where the UK holds a significant proportion of the world's total population. They mainly derive from lists originally drawn up for the UK Biodiversity Action Plan (UK BAP). Similarly the list of habitats of principal importance in England also derive from the UK Biodiversity Action Plan. Both lists were reviewed in 2007, and the total number of UK BAP habitats increased from 45 to 65, and the number of UK BAP species increased from under 600 to 1,150.

From these, the formal list just for England (and laid out below) finally contained 56 of those 65 habitats, and 943 of the original 1,150 UK species.

=== Legal obligations ===
Section 40 of The Natural Environment and Rural Communities (NERC) Act 2006 places a legal obligation on public bodies in England to have regard to particular living organisms and types of habitat which are of the greatest conservation importance whilst carrying out their functions, whilst also having a general regard for protecting all biodiversity. Section 41 of that same Act of Parliament requires the Secretary of State to maintain and publish statutory lists of these features - a function carried out on his/her behalf by Defra and Natural England. The lists given here are sometimes known as the 'Section 41 lists', or 'priority habitats' and 'priority species' lists. They replace an earlier list which was required under Section 74 of the CRoW Act of 2000, and which was published by Defra two years later, though their contents were at that time identical to the UK BAP priority habitats and species lists.

=== Significance ===
Awareness of the presence of any principal species or principal habitat identified on these lists is of great importance within the local authority planning process when land is considered for development. Along with legally protected species, statutory and non-statutory sites, knowledge of their presence is required if the impact of future development is to be avoided or mitigated. By fully considering all these features in the decision-making process, the planning authority will have demonstrated that it has discharged its duties to conserve biodiversity.

== Habitats of 'principal importance' in England ==
The latest update to the list of Section 41 habitats of principal importance (priority habitats) was published by Natural England in August 2010.

The list shows the broad habitat group, followed by name of the habitat of principal importance (as used by original source).

- Arable and horticulture: Arable field margins
- Arable and horticulture: Traditional orchards
- Boundary: Hedgerows
- Coastal: Coastal saltmarsh
- Coastal: Coastal sand dunes
- Coastal: Coastal vegetated shingle
- Coastal: Intertidal mudflats
- Coastal: Maritime cliff and slopes
- Coastal: Saline lagoons
- Freshwater: Aquifer-fed naturally fluctuating water bodies
- Freshwater: Eutrophic standing waters
- Freshwater: Mesotrophic lakes
- Freshwater: Oligotrophic and dystrophic lakes
- Freshwater: Ponds
- Freshwater: Rivers
- Grassland: Lowland calcareous grassland
- Grassland: Lowland dry acid grassland
- Grassland: Lowland meadows
- Grassland: Purple moor-grass and rush pastures
- Grassland: Upland calcareous grassland
- Grassland: Upland hay meadows
- Heathland: Lowland heathland
- Heathland: Mountain heaths and willow scrub
- Heathland: Upland heathland
- Inland rock: Calaminarian grasslands
- Inland rock: Inland rock outcrop and scree habitats
- Inland rock: Limestone pavements
- Inland rock: Open mosaic habitats on previously developed land
- Marine: Blue mussel beds
- Marine: Estuarine rocky habitats
- Marine: Fragile sponge and anthozoan communities on subtidal rocky habitats
- Marine: Horse mussel beds
- Marine: Intertidal boulder communities
- Marine: Intertidal chalk
- Marine: Maërl beds
- Marine: Mud habitats in deep water
- Marine: Peat and clay exposures
- Marine: Sabellaria alveolata reefs
- Marine: Sabellaria spinulosa reefs
- Marine: Seagrass beds
- Marine: Sheltered muddy gravels
- Marine: Subtidal chalk
- Marine: Subtidal sands and gravels
- Marine: Tide-swept channels
- Wetland: Blanket bog
- Wetland: Coastal and floodplain grazing marsh
- Wetland: Lowland fens
- Wetland: Lowland raised bog
- Wetland: Reedbeds
- Wetland: Upland flushes, fens and swamps
- Woodland: Lowland beech and yew woodland
- Woodland: Lowland mixed deciduous woodland
- Woodland: Upland mixed ashwoods
- Woodland: Upland oakwood
- Woodland: Wet woodland
- Woodland: Wood-pasture and parkland

== Species of 'principal importance' in England ==
The latest update to the Section 41 list of species of principal importance for the conservation of biodiversity in England (priority species) was published by Natural England in May 2014. It now includes 943 species.

List of species of 'principal importance' in England (After sorting, refresh page to return table to original order)
Common name	Scientific name	Taxonomic category	Taxon
Water vole	Arvicola amphibius	Vertebrates	Mammal
Barbastelle bat	Barbastella barbastellus	Vertebrates	Mammal
Hedgehog	Erinaceus europaeus	Vertebrates	Mammal
Brown hare	Lepus europaeus	Vertebrates	Mammal
Mountain hare	Lepus timidus	Vertebrates	Mammal
Otter	Lutra lutra	Vertebrates	Mammal
Pine marten	Martes martes	Vertebrates	Mammal
Harvest mouse	Micromys minutus	Vertebrates	Mammal
Dormouse	Muscardinus avellanarius	Vertebrates	Mammal
Polecat	Mustela putorius	Vertebrates	Mammal
Bechstein's bat	Myotis bechsteinii	Vertebrates	Mammal
Noctule	Nyctalus noctula	Vertebrates	Mammal
Common seal (eastern atlantic harbour seal)	Phoca vitulina	Vertebrates	Mammal
Soprano pipistrelle	Pipistrellus pygmaeus	Vertebrates	Mammal
Brown long-eared bat	Plecotus auritus	Vertebrates	Mammal
Greater horseshoe bat	Rhinolophus ferrumequinum	Vertebrates	Mammal
Lesser horseshoe bat	Rhinolophus hipposideros	Vertebrates	Mammal
Red squirrel	Sciurus vulgaris	Vertebrates	Mammal
Minke whale	Balaenoptera acutorostrata	Vertebrates	Cetacean
Sei whale	Balaenoptera borealis	Vertebrates	Cetacean
Fin whale	Balaenoptera physalus	Vertebrates	Cetacean
Common dolphin	Delphinus delphis	Vertebrates	Cetacean
Northern right whale	Eubalaena glacialis	Vertebrates	Cetacean
Long-finned pilot whale	Globicephala melas	Vertebrates	Cetacean
Risso's dolphin	Grampus griseus	Vertebrates	Cetacean
Atlantic white-sided dolphin	Leucopleurus acutus	Vertebrates	Cetacean
White-beaked dolphin	Lagenorhynchus albirostris	Vertebrates	Cetacean
Sowerby's beaked whale	Mesoplodon bidens	Vertebrates	Cetacean
True's beaked whale	Mesoplodon mirus	Vertebrates	Cetacean
Killer whale	Orcinus orca	Vertebrates	Cetacean
Harbour porpoise	Phocoena phocoena	Vertebrates	Cetacean
Sperm whale	Physeter catodon	Vertebrates	Cetacean
Bottlenosed dolphin	Tursiops truncatus	Vertebrates	Cetacean
Cuvier's beaked whale	Ziphius cavirostris	Vertebrates	Cetacean
Slowworm	Anguis fragilis	Vertebrates	Reptile
Smooth snake	Coronella austriaca	Vertebrates	Reptile
Sand lizard	Lacerta agilis	Vertebrates	Reptile
Grass snake	Natrix helvetica	Vertebrates	Reptile
Adder	Vipera berus	Vertebrates	Reptile
Common lizard	Zootoca vivipara	Vertebrates	Reptile
Loggerhead turtle	Caretta caretta	Vertebrates	Turtle
Leatherback turtle	Dermochelys coriacea	Vertebrates	Turtle
Common toad	Bufo bufo	Vertebrates	Amphibian
Natterjack toad	Epidalea calamita	Vertebrates	Amphibian
Pool frog	Pelophylax lessonae	Vertebrates	Amphibian
Great crested newt	Triturus cristatus	Vertebrates	Amphibian
Common sturgeon	Acipenser sturio	Vertebrates	Fish - bony
Allis shad	Alosa alosa	Vertebrates	Fish - bony
Twaite shad	Alosa fallax	Vertebrates	Fish - bony
Lesser sandeel	Ammodytes marinus	Vertebrates	Fish - bony
European eel	Anguilla anguilla	Vertebrates	Fish - bony
Black scabbardfish	Aphanopus carbo	Vertebrates	Fish - bony
Herring	Clupea harengus	Vertebrates	Fish - bony
Roundnose grenadier	Coryphaenoides rupestris	Vertebrates	Fish - bony
Atlantic cod	Gadus morhua	Vertebrates	Fish - bony
Long-snouted seahorse	Hippocampus guttulatus	Vertebrates	Fish - bony
Short-snouted seahorse	Hippocampus hippocampus	Vertebrates	Fish - bony
Atlantic halibut	Hippoglossus hippoglossus	Vertebrates	Fish - bony
Orange roughy	Hoplostethus atlanticus	Vertebrates	Fish - bony
Sea monkfish	Lophius piscatorius	Vertebrates	Fish - bony
Whiting	Merlangius merlangus	Vertebrates	Fish - bony
European hake	Merluccius merluccius	Vertebrates	Fish - bony
Blue whiting	Micromesistius poutassou	Vertebrates	Fish - bony
Blue ling	Molva dypterygia	Vertebrates	Fish - bony
Ling	Molva molva	Vertebrates	Fish - bony
Smelt (sparling)	Osmerus eperlanus	Vertebrates	Fish - bony
Plaice	Pleuronectes platessa	Vertebrates	Fish - bony
Greenland halibut	Reinhardtius hippoglossoides	Vertebrates	Fish - bony
Mackerel	Scomber scombrus	Vertebrates	Fish - bony
Common sole	Solea solea	Vertebrates	Fish - bony
Blue-fin tuna	Thunnus thynnus	Vertebrates	Fish - bony
Horse mackerel	Trachurus trachurus	Vertebrates	Fish - bony
Spined loach	Cobitis taenia	Vertebrates	Fish - bony
Vendace	Coregonus albula	Vertebrates	Fish - bony
Whitefish (powan, gwyniad or schelly)	Coregonus lavaretus	Vertebrates	Fish - bony
Burbot	Lota lota	Vertebrates	Fish - bony
Atlantic salmon	Salmo salar	Vertebrates	Fish - bony
Brown/sea trout	Salmo trutta	Vertebrates	Fish - bony
Arctic charr	Salvelinus alpinus	Vertebrates	Fish - bony
River lamprey	Lampetra fluviatilis	Vertebrates	Fish - jawless
Sea lamprey	Petromyzon marinus	Vertebrates	Fish - jawless
Gulper shark	Centrophorus granulosus	Vertebrates	Shark/Skate/Ray
Leafscraper shark	Centrophorus squamosus	Vertebrates	Shark/Skate/Ray
Portuguese dogfish	Centroscymnus coelolepis	Vertebrates	Shark/Skate/Ray
Basking shark	Cetorhinus maximus	Vertebrates	Shark/Skate/Ray
Kitefin shark	Dalatias licha	Vertebrates	Shark/Skate/Ray
Tope shark	Galeorhinus galeus	Vertebrates	Shark/Skate/Ray
Shortfin mako	Isurus oxyrinchus	Vertebrates	Shark/Skate/Ray
Porbeagle shark	Lamna nasus	Vertebrates	Shark/Skate/Ray
Blue shark	Prionace glauca	Vertebrates	Shark/Skate/Ray
Spiny dogfish	Squalus acanthias	Vertebrates	Shark/Skate/Ray
Common skate	Dipturus batis	Vertebrates	Shark/Skate/Ray
White or bottlenosed skate	Rostroraja alba	Vertebrates	Shark/Skate/Ray
Undulate ray	Raja undulata	Vertebrates	Shark/Skate/Ray
Aquatic warbler	Acrocephalus paludicola	Vertebrates	Bird
Marsh warbler	Acrocephalus palustris	Vertebrates	Bird
Skylark	Alauda arvensis subsp. arvensis/scotica	Vertebrates	Bird
European greater white-fronted goose	Anser albifrons subsp. albifrons	Vertebrates	Bird
Tree pipit	Anthus trivialis	Vertebrates	Bird
Greater scaup	Aythya marila	Vertebrates	Bird
Great bittern	Botaurus stellaris	Vertebrates	Bird
Dark-bellied brent goose	Branta bernicla subsp. bernicla	Vertebrates	Bird
Stone-curlew	Burhinus oedicnemus	Vertebrates	Bird
European nightjar	Caprimulgus europaeus	Vertebrates	Bird
Lesser redpoll	Carduelis cabaret	Vertebrates	Bird
Common linnet	Carduelis cannabina subsp. autochthona/cannabina	Vertebrates	Bird
Twite	Carduelis flavirostris subsp. bensonorum/pipilans	Vertebrates	Bird
Hen harrier	Circus cyaneus	Vertebrates	Bird
Hawfinch	Coccothraustes coccothraustes	Vertebrates	Bird
Corn crake	Crex crex	Vertebrates	Bird
Common cuckoo	Cuculus canorus	Vertebrates	Bird
Tundra swan	Cygnus columbianus subsp. bewickii	Vertebrates	Bird
Lesser spotted woodpecker	Dendrocopos minor subsp. comminutus	Vertebrates	Bird
Corn bunting	Emberiza calandra subsp. calandra/clanceyi	Vertebrates	Bird
Cirl bunting	Emberiza cirlus	Vertebrates	Bird
Yellowhammer	Emberiza citrinella	Vertebrates	Bird
Reed bunting	Emberiza schoeniclus	Vertebrates	Bird
Red grouse	Lagopus lagopus subsp. scotica	Vertebrates	Bird
Herring gull	Larus argentatus subsp. argenteus	Vertebrates	Bird
Black-tailed godwit	Limosa limosa subsp. limosa	Vertebrates	Bird
Savi's warbler	Locustella luscinioides	Vertebrates	Bird
Common grasshopper warbler	Locustella naevia	Vertebrates	Bird
Wood lark	Lullula arborea	Vertebrates	Bird
Common scoter	Melanitta nigra	Vertebrates	Bird
Yellow wagtail	Motacilla flava subsp. flavissima	Vertebrates	Bird
Spotted flycatcher	Muscicapa striata	Vertebrates	Bird
Eurasian curlew	Numenius arquata	Vertebrates	Bird
House sparrow	Passer domesticus	Vertebrates	Bird
Eurasian tree sparrow	Passer montanus	Vertebrates	Bird
Grey partridge	Perdix perdix	Vertebrates	Bird
Wood warbler	Phylloscopus sibilatrix	Vertebrates	Bird
Willow tit	Poecile montanus subsp. kleinschimdti	Vertebrates	Bird
Marsh tit	Poecile palustris subsp. palustris/dresseri	Vertebrates	Bird
Hedge accentor	Prunella modularis subsp. occidentalis	Vertebrates	Bird
Balearic shearwater	Puffinus mauretanicus	Vertebrates	Bird
Common bullfinch	Pyrrhula pyrrhula subsp. pileata	Vertebrates	Bird
Roseate tern	Sterna dougallii	Vertebrates	Bird
European turtle dove	Streptopelia turtur	Vertebrates	Bird
Common starling	Sturnus vulgaris subsp. vulgaris	Vertebrates	Bird
Black grouse	Tetrao tetrix subsp. britannicus	Vertebrates	Bird
Song thrush	Turdus philomelos subsp. clarkei	Vertebrates	Bird
Ring ouzel	Turdus torquatus	Vertebrates	Bird
Northern lapwing	Vanellus vanellus	Vertebrates	Bird
Dark guest ant	Anergates atratulus	Terrestrial invertebrates	Ant
Narrow-headed ant	Formica exsecta	Terrestrial invertebrates	Ant
Black-backed meadow ant	Formica pratensis	Terrestrial invertebrates	Ant
Red barbed ant	Formica rufibarbis	Terrestrial invertebrates	Ant
Shining guest ant	Formicoxenus nitidulus	Terrestrial invertebrates	Ant
Erratic ant	Tapinoma erraticum	Terrestrial invertebrates	Ant
Long-spined ant	Temnothorax interruptus	Terrestrial invertebrates	Ant
Oak mining bee	Andrena ferox	Terrestrial invertebrates	Bee
Tormentil mining bee	Andrena tarsata	Terrestrial invertebrates	Bee
Potter flower bee	Anthophora retusa	Terrestrial invertebrates	Bee
Brown-banded carder bee	Bombus humilis	Terrestrial invertebrates	Bee
Moss carder bee	Bombus muscorum	Terrestrial invertebrates	Bee
Red-shanked carder-bee	Bombus ruderarius	Terrestrial invertebrates	Bee
Large garden bumblebee	Bombus ruderatus	Terrestrial invertebrates	Bee
Short haired bumblebee	Bombus subterraneus	Terrestrial invertebrates	Bee
Shrill carder bee	Bombus sylvarum	Terrestrial invertebrates	Bee
Northern colletes	Colletes floralis	Terrestrial invertebrates	Bee
Sea-aster colletes bee	Colletes halophilus	Terrestrial invertebrates	Bee
Long-horned bee	Eucera longicornis	Terrestrial invertebrates	Bee
a solitary bee	Lasioglossum angusticeps	Terrestrial invertebrates	Bee
Scabious cuckoo bee	Nomada armata	Terrestrial invertebrates	Bee
a cuckoo bee	Nomada errans	Terrestrial invertebrates	Bee
Wall mason bee	Osmia parietina	Terrestrial invertebrates	Bee
Large mason bee	Osmia xanthomelana	Terrestrial invertebrates	Bee
Sharp's diving beetle	Agabus brunneus	Terrestrial invertebrates	Beetle
a ground beetle	Agonum scitulum	Terrestrial invertebrates	Beetle
Early sunshiner	Amara famelica	Terrestrial invertebrates	Beetle
Wormwood moonshiner	Amara fusca	Terrestrial invertebrates	Beetle
Red-horned cardinal click beetle	Ampedus rufipennis	Terrestrial invertebrates	Beetle
Heath short-spur	Anisodactylus nemorivagus	Terrestrial invertebrates	Beetle
Saltmarsh short-spur	Anisodactylus poeciloides	Terrestrial invertebrates	Beetle
Chestnut coloured click beetle	Anostirus castaneus	Terrestrial invertebrates	Beetle
Flowering rush weevil	Bagous nodulosus	Terrestrial invertebrates	Beetle
Thorne pin-palp	Bembidion humerale	Terrestrial invertebrates	Beetle
Scarce four-dot pin-palp	Bembidion quadripustulatum	Terrestrial invertebrates	Beetle
Pale pin-palp	Bembidion testaceum	Terrestrial invertebrates	Beetle
One-grooved diving beetle	Bidessus unistriatus	Terrestrial invertebrates	Beetle
Streaked bombardier beetle	Brachinus sclopeta	Terrestrial invertebrates	Beetle
Silt silver-spot	Bracteon argenteolum	Terrestrial invertebrates	Beetle
Poplar leaf-rolling weevil	Byctiscus populi	Terrestrial invertebrates	Beetle
Caterpillar-hunter	Calosoma inquisitor	Terrestrial invertebrates	Beetle
Blue ground beetle	Carabus intricatus	Terrestrial invertebrates	Beetle
a ground beetle	Carabus monilis	Terrestrial invertebrates	Beetle
Black night-runner	Chlaenius tristis	Terrestrial invertebrates	Beetle
Tansy beetle	Chrysolina graminis	Terrestrial invertebrates	Beetle
Northern dune tiger beetle	Cicindela hybrida	Terrestrial invertebrates	Beetle
Heath tiger beetle	Cicindela sylvatica	Terrestrial invertebrates	Beetle
Hazel pot beetle	Cryptocephalus coryli	Terrestrial invertebrates	Beetle
Ten-spotted pot beetle	Cryptocephalus decemmaculatus	Terrestrial invertebrates	Beetle
Pashford pot beetle	Cryptocephalus exiguus	Terrestrial invertebrates	Beetle
Shining pot beetle	Cryptocephalus nitidulus	Terrestrial invertebrates	Beetle
Rock-rose pot beetle	Cryptocephalus primarius	Terrestrial invertebrates	Beetle
Blue pepper-pot beetle	Cryptocephalus punctiger	Terrestrial invertebrates	Beetle
Six-spotted pot beetle	Cryptocephalus sexpunctatus	Terrestrial invertebrates	Beetle
Mire pill-beetle	Curimopsis nigrita	Terrestrial invertebrates	Beetle
Cliff tiger beetle	Cylindera germanica	Terrestrial invertebrates	Beetle
Zircon reed beetle	Donacia aquatica	Terrestrial invertebrates	Beetle
Two-tone reed beetle	Donacia bicolora	Terrestrial invertebrates	Beetle
Petty whin weevil	Exapion genistae	Terrestrial invertebrates	Beetle
Noble chafer	Gnorimus nobilis	Terrestrial invertebrates	Beetle
Variable chafer	Gnorimus variabilis	Terrestrial invertebrates	Beetle
Spangled water beetle	Graphoderus zonatus	Terrestrial invertebrates	Beetle
Brush-thighed seed-eater	Harpalus froelichii	Terrestrial invertebrates	Beetle
St. Bees seed-eater	Harpalus honestus	Terrestrial invertebrates	Beetle
a seed-eater ground beetle	Harpalus melancholicus	Terrestrial invertebrates	Beetle
New forest mud beetle	Helophorus laticollis	Terrestrial invertebrates	Beetle
Gravel water beetle	Hydrochus nitidicollis	Terrestrial invertebrates	Beetle
Ron's diving beetle	Hydroporus necopinatus subsp. roni	Terrestrial invertebrates	Beetle
Oxbow diving beetle	Hydroporus rufifrons	Terrestrial invertebrates	Beetle
Sussex diving beetle	Laccophilus poecilus	Terrestrial invertebrates	Beetle
Oak click beetle	Lacon querceus	Terrestrial invertebrates	Beetle
Blue plunderer	Lebia cyanocephala	Terrestrial invertebrates	Beetle
Violet click beetle	Limoniscus violaceus	Terrestrial invertebrates	Beetle
Stag beetle	Lucanus cervus	Terrestrial invertebrates	Beetle
Scarlet malachite beetle	Malachius aeneus	Terrestrial invertebrates	Beetle
Queens executioner	Megapenthes lugens	Terrestrial invertebrates	Beetle
Sallow guest weevil	Melanapion minimum	Terrestrial invertebrates	Beetle
Bearded false darkling beetle	Melandrya barbata	Terrestrial invertebrates	Beetle
Sandwich click beetle	Melanotus punctolineatus	Terrestrial invertebrates	Beetle
Black oil beetle	Meloe proscarabaeus	Terrestrial invertebrates	Beetle
Rough oil beetle	Meloe rugosus	Terrestrial invertebrates	Beetle
Violet oil beetle	Meloe violaceus	Terrestrial invertebrates	Beetle
a river shingle beetle	Meotica anglica	Terrestrial invertebrates	Beetle
Eyed longhorn beetle	Oberea oculata	Terrestrial invertebrates	Beetle
Rockface beetle	Ochthebius poweri	Terrestrial invertebrates	Beetle
Set-aside downy-back	Ophonus laticollis	Terrestrial invertebrates	Beetle
Mellet's downy-back	Ophonus melletii	Terrestrial invertebrates	Beetle
a downy-back ground beetle	Ophonus puncticollis	Terrestrial invertebrates	Beetle
Oolite downy-back	Ophonus stictus	Terrestrial invertebrates	Beetle
Alder flea weevil	Orchestes testaceus	Terrestrial invertebrates	Beetle
Crucifix ground beetle	Panagaeus cruxmajor	Terrestrial invertebrates	Beetle
Mab's lantern	Philorhizus quadrisignatus	Terrestrial invertebrates	Beetle
a ground beetle	Philorhizus vectensis	Terrestrial invertebrates	Beetle
Cosnard's net-winged beetle	Platycis cosnardi	Terrestrial invertebrates	Beetle
Kugelann's green clock	Poecilus kugelanni	Terrestrial invertebrates	Beetle
Yellow pogonus	Pogonus luridipennis	Terrestrial invertebrates	Beetle
Lundy cabbage flea beetle	Psylliodes luridipennis	Terrestrial invertebrates	Beetle
Skeetle	Stenus longitarsis	Terrestrial invertebrates	Beetle
Hairy click beetle	Synaptus filiformis	Terrestrial invertebrates	Beetle
a leafhopper	Chlorita viridula	Terrestrial invertebrates	Bug
New forest cicada	Cicadetta montana	Terrestrial invertebrates	Bug
Large dune leafhopper	Doratura impudica	Terrestrial invertebrates	Bug
Chalk planthopper	Eurysa douglasi	Terrestrial invertebrates	Bug
Carline thistle leafhopper	Euscelis venosus	Terrestrial invertebrates	Bug
Lesser water measurer	Hydrometra gracilenta	Terrestrial invertebrates	Bug
Pondweed leafhopper	Macrosteles cyane	Terrestrial invertebrates	Bug
Apple lace-bug	Physatocheila smreczynskii	Terrestrial invertebrates	Bug
Tall fescue planthopper	Ribautodelphax imitans	Terrestrial invertebrates	Bug
Hairy shore-bug	Saldula setulosa	Terrestrial invertebrates	Bug
Northern brown argus	Aricia artaxerxes	Terrestrial invertebrates	Butterfly
Pearl-bordered fritillary	Boloria euphrosyne	Terrestrial invertebrates	Butterfly
Small pearl-bordered fritillary	Boloria selene	Terrestrial invertebrates	Butterfly
Small heath	Coenonympha pamphilus	Terrestrial invertebrates	Butterfly
Large heath	Coenonympha tullia	Terrestrial invertebrates	Butterfly
Small blue	Cupido minimus	Terrestrial invertebrates	Butterfly
Mountain ringlet	Erebia epiphron	Terrestrial invertebrates	Butterfly
Dingy skipper	Erynnis tages	Terrestrial invertebrates	Butterfly
Marsh fritillary	Euphydryas aurinia	Terrestrial invertebrates	Butterfly
High brown fritillary	Fabriciana adippe	Terrestrial invertebrates	Butterfly
Duke of burgundy	Hamearis lucina	Terrestrial invertebrates	Butterfly
Grayling	Hipparchia semele	Terrestrial invertebrates	Butterfly
Wall	Lasiommata megera	Terrestrial invertebrates	Butterfly
Wood white	Leptidea sinapis	Terrestrial invertebrates	Butterfly
White admiral	Limenitis camilla	Terrestrial invertebrates	Butterfly
Heath fritillary	Melitaea athalia	Terrestrial invertebrates	Butterfly
Glanville fritillary	Melitaea cinxia	Terrestrial invertebrates	Butterfly
Large blue	Phengaris arion	Terrestrial invertebrates	Butterfly
Silver-studded blue	Plebejus argus	Terrestrial invertebrates	Butterfly
Grizzled skipper	Pyrgus malvae	Terrestrial invertebrates	Butterfly
White-letter hairstreak	Satyrium w-album	Terrestrial invertebrates	Butterfly
Brown hairstreak	Thecla betulae	Terrestrial invertebrates	Butterfly
Lulworth skipper	Thymelicus acteon	Terrestrial invertebrates	Butterfly
Small grey sedge	Glossosoma intermedium	Terrestrial invertebrates	Caddisfly
Window winged sedge	Hagenella clathrata	Terrestrial invertebrates	Caddisfly
Scarce grey flag	Hydropsyche bulgaromanorum	Terrestrial invertebrates	Caddisfly
Scarce brown sedge	Ironoquia dubia	Terrestrial invertebrates	Caddisfly
Norfolk hawker	Aeshna isosceles	Terrestrial invertebrates	Dragonfly
Southern damselfly	Coenagrion mercuriale	Terrestrial invertebrates	Damselfly
Variegated fruit-fly	Amiota variegata	Terrestrial invertebrates	Fly
Hornet robberfly	Asilus crabroniformis	Terrestrial invertebrates	Fly
Black fungus gnat	Asindulum nigrum	Terrestrial invertebrates	Fly
Heath bee-fly	Bombylius minor	Terrestrial invertebrates	Fly
Golden hoverfly	Callicera spinolae	Terrestrial invertebrates	Fly
Fancy-legged fly	Campsicnemus magius	Terrestrial invertebrates	Fly
Broken-banded wasp-hoverfly	Chrysotoxum octomaculatum	Terrestrial invertebrates	Fly
Southern silver stiletto-fly	Cliorismia rustica	Terrestrial invertebrates	Fly
Broads long-legged fly	Dolichopus laticola	Terrestrial invertebrates	Fly
Bure long-legged fly	Dolichopus nigripes	Terrestrial invertebrates	Fly
Phantom hoverfly	Doros profuges	Terrestrial invertebrates	Fly
Picture winged fly	Dorycera graminum	Terrestrial invertebrates	Fly
Clubbed big-headed fly	Dorylomorpha clavifemora	Terrestrial invertebrates	Fly
English assassin fly	Empis limata	Terrestrial invertebrates	Fly
Bog hoverfly	Eristalis cryptarum	Terrestrial invertebrates	Fly
Royal splinter cranefly	Gnophomyia elsneri	Terrestrial invertebrates	Fly
Six-spotted cranefly	Idiocera sexguttata	Terrestrial invertebrates	Fly
Cigarillo gall-fly	Lipara similis	Terrestrial invertebrates	Fly
Northern yellow splinter	Lipsothrix errans	Terrestrial invertebrates	Fly
Southern yellow splinter	Lipsothrix nervosa	Terrestrial invertebrates	Fly
Scarce yellow splinter	Lipsothrix nigristigma	Terrestrial invertebrates	Fly
Western wood-vase hoverfly	Myolepta potens	Terrestrial invertebrates	Fly
a fungus gnat	Neoempheria lineola	Terrestrial invertebrates	Fly
Barred green colonel	Odontomyia hydroleon	Terrestrial invertebrates	Fly
Hairy canary	Phaonia jaroschewskii	Terrestrial invertebrates	Fly
River-shore cranefly	Rhabdomastix japonica	Terrestrial invertebrates	Fly
Dune snail-killing fly	Salticella fasciata	Terrestrial invertebrates	Fly
Mottled bee-fly	Thyridanthrax fenestratus	Terrestrial invertebrates	Fly
Wart-biter bush cricket	Decticus verrucivorus	Terrestrial invertebrates	Grasshopper/cricket
Mole cricket	Gryllotalpa gryllotalpa	Terrestrial invertebrates	Grasshopper/cricket
Field cricket	Gryllus campestris	Terrestrial invertebrates	Grasshopper/cricket
Large marsh grasshopper	Stethophyma grossum	Terrestrial invertebrates	Grasshopper/cricket
Iron blue mayfly	Nigrobaetis niger	Terrestrial invertebrates	Mayfly
Yellow mayfly	Potamanthus luteus	Terrestrial invertebrates	Mayfly
Reddish buff	Acosmetia caliginosa	Terrestrial invertebrates	Moth
Grey dagger	Acronicta psi	Terrestrial invertebrates	Moth
Knot grass	Acronicta rumicis	Terrestrial invertebrates	Moth
The forester	Adscita statices	Terrestrial invertebrates	Moth
Greenweed flat-body moth	Agonopterix atomella	Terrestrial invertebrates	Moth
Fuscous flat-body moth	Agonopterix capreolella	Terrestrial invertebrates	Moth
Flounced chestnut	Agrochola helvola	Terrestrial invertebrates	Moth
Brown-spot pinion	Agrochola litura	Terrestrial invertebrates	Moth
Beaded chestnut	Agrochola lychnidis	Terrestrial invertebrates	Moth
Beautiful pearl	Agrotera nemoralis	Terrestrial invertebrates	Moth
Sloe carpet	Aleucis distinctata	Terrestrial invertebrates	Moth
Green-brindled crescent	Allophyes oxyacanthae	Terrestrial invertebrates	Moth
Ear moth	Amphipoea oculea	Terrestrial invertebrates	Moth
Mouse moth	Amphipyra tragopoginis	Terrestrial invertebrates	Moth
White-spotted sable moth	Anania funebris	Terrestrial invertebrates	Moth
Large nutmeg	Apamea anceps	Terrestrial invertebrates	Moth
Dusky brocade	Apamea remissa	Terrestrial invertebrates	Moth
Rest harrow	Aplasta ononaria	Terrestrial invertebrates	Moth
Scarce brown streak	Aplota palpella	Terrestrial invertebrates	Moth
Deep-brown dart	Aporophyla lutulenta	Terrestrial invertebrates	Moth
White-mantled wainscot	Archanara neurica	Terrestrial invertebrates	Moth
Garden tiger	Arctia caja	Terrestrial invertebrates	Moth
Straw belle	Aspitates gilvaria subsp. gilvaria	Terrestrial invertebrates	Moth
Sprawler	Asteroscopus sphinx	Terrestrial invertebrates	Moth
Centre-barred sallow	Atethmia centrago	Terrestrial invertebrates	Moth
Marsh moth	Athetis pallustris	Terrestrial invertebrates	Moth
Dark brocade	Blepharita adusta	Terrestrial invertebrates	Moth
Minor shoulder knot	Brachylomia viminalis	Terrestrial invertebrates	Moth
Mottled rustic	Caradrina morpheus	Terrestrial invertebrates	Moth
Light crimson underwing	Catocala promissa	Terrestrial invertebrates	Moth
Dark crimson underwing	Catocala sponsa	Terrestrial invertebrates	Moth
Haworth's minor	Celaena haworthii	Terrestrial invertebrates	Moth
Crescent	Celaena leucostigma	Terrestrial invertebrates	Moth
Mistletoe marble	Celypha woodiana	Terrestrial invertebrates	Moth
Streak	Chesias legatella	Terrestrial invertebrates	Moth
Broom-tip	Chesias rufata	Terrestrial invertebrates	Moth
Latticed heath	Chiasmia clathrata	Terrestrial invertebrates	Moth
Fenn's wainscot	Chortodes brevilinea	Terrestrial invertebrates	Moth
The concolorous	Chortodes extrema	Terrestrial invertebrates	Moth
Water-dock case-bearer	Coleophora hydrolapathella	Terrestrial invertebrates	Moth
Basil-thyme case-bearer	Coleophora tricolor	Terrestrial invertebrates	Moth
Large gold case-bearer	Coleophora vibicella	Terrestrial invertebrates	Moth
Betony case-bearer	Coleophora wockeella	Terrestrial invertebrates	Moth
Speckled footman	Coscinia cribraria subsp. bivittata	Terrestrial invertebrates	Moth
White-spotted pinion	Cosmia diffinis	Terrestrial invertebrates	Moth
Goat moth	Cossus cossus	Terrestrial invertebrates	Moth
Dingy mocha	Cyclophora pendularia	Terrestrial invertebrates	Moth
False mocha	Cyclophora porata	Terrestrial invertebrates	Moth
Oak lutestring	Cymatophorima diluta	Terrestrial invertebrates	Moth
Brindled ochre	Dasypolia templi	Terrestrial invertebrates	Moth
Small square-spot	Diarsia rubi	Terrestrial invertebrates	Moth
Heart moth	Dicycla oo	Terrestrial invertebrates	Moth
Figure of eight	Diloba caeruleocephala	Terrestrial invertebrates	Moth
Small phoenix	Ecliptopera silaceata	Terrestrial invertebrates	Moth
September thorn	Ennomos erosaria	Terrestrial invertebrates	Moth
Dusky thorn	Ennomos fuscantaria	Terrestrial invertebrates	Moth
August thorn	Ennomos quercinaria	Terrestrial invertebrates	Moth
Grey mountain carpet	Entephria caesiata	Terrestrial invertebrates	Moth
Chalk-hill lance-wing	Epermenia insecurella	Terrestrial invertebrates	Moth
Dark bordered beauty	Epione vespertaria	Terrestrial invertebrates	Moth
Galium carpet	Epirrhoe galiata	Terrestrial invertebrates	Moth
Dorset tineid moth (or Richardson's case-bearer)	Eudarcia richardsoni	Terrestrial invertebrates	Moth
Autumnal rustic	Eugnorisma glareosa	Terrestrial invertebrates	Moth
Spinach	Eulithis mellinata	Terrestrial invertebrates	Moth
Scarce pug	Eupithecia extensaria subsp. occidua	Terrestrial invertebrates	Moth
Netted carpet	Eustroma reticulatum	Terrestrial invertebrates	Moth
Garden dart	Euxoa nigricans	Terrestrial invertebrates	Moth
White-line dart	Euxoa tritici	Terrestrial invertebrates	Moth
Double dart	Graphiphora augur	Terrestrial invertebrates	Moth
Liquorice piercer	Grapholita pallifrontana	Terrestrial invertebrates	Moth
White spot	Hadena albimacula	Terrestrial invertebrates	Moth
Bordered gothic	Heliophobus reticulata	Terrestrial invertebrates	Moth
Shoulder-striped clover	Heliothis maritima subsp. warneckei	Terrestrial invertebrates	Moth
Narrow-bordered bee hawk-moth	Hemaris tityus	Terrestrial invertebrates	Moth
Small emerald	Hemistola chrysoprasaria	Terrestrial invertebrates	Moth
Ghost moth	Hepialus humuli	Terrestrial invertebrates	Moth
Rustic	Hoplodrina blanda	Terrestrial invertebrates	Moth
Rosy rustic	Hydraecia micacea	Terrestrial invertebrates	Moth
Marsh mallow moth	Hydraecia osseola subsp. hucherardi	Terrestrial invertebrates	Moth
Silky wave	Idaea dilutaria	Terrestrial invertebrates	Moth
Bright wave	Idaea ochrata subsp. cantiata	Terrestrial invertebrates	Moth
Orange upperwing	Jodia croceago	Terrestrial invertebrates	Moth
Currant-shoot borer	Lampronia capitella	Terrestrial invertebrates	Moth
Grey carpet	Lithostege griseata	Terrestrial invertebrates	Moth
Sandhill rustic	Luperina nickerlii subsp. leechi	Terrestrial invertebrates	Moth
Brindled beauty	Lycia hirtaria	Terrestrial invertebrates	Moth
Belted beauty	Lycia zonaria subsp. britannica	Terrestrial invertebrates	Moth
V-moth	Macaria wauaria	Terrestrial invertebrates	Moth
Lackey	Malacosoma neustria	Terrestrial invertebrates	Moth
Dot moth	Melanchra persicariae	Terrestrial invertebrates	Moth
Broom moth	Melanchra pisi	Terrestrial invertebrates	Moth
Pretty chalk carpet	Melanthia procellata	Terrestrial invertebrates	Moth
Rosy minor	Mesoligia literosa	Terrestrial invertebrates	Moth
Drab looper	Minoa murinata	Terrestrial invertebrates	Moth
Shoulder-striped wainscot	Mythimna comma	Terrestrial invertebrates	Moth
Horehound long-horn moth	Nemophora fasciella	Terrestrial invertebrates	Moth
Lunar yellow underwing	Noctua orbona	Terrestrial invertebrates	Moth
Scarce vapourer	Orgyia recens	Terrestrial invertebrates	Moth
Brighton wainscot	Oria musculosa	Terrestrial invertebrates	Moth
Oblique carpet	Orthonama vittata	Terrestrial invertebrates	Moth
Powdered quaker	Orthosia gracilis	Terrestrial invertebrates	Moth
Clay fan-foot	Paracolax tristalis	Terrestrial invertebrates	Moth
Barberry carpet	Pareulype berberata	Terrestrial invertebrates	Moth
Common fan-foot	Pechipogo strigilata	Terrestrial invertebrates	Moth
Dark spinach	Pelurga comitata	Terrestrial invertebrates	Moth
Grass rivulet	Perizoma albulata subsp. albulata	Terrestrial invertebrates	Moth
Scarce aspen midget moth	Phyllonorycter sagitella	Terrestrial invertebrates	Moth
Surrey midget moth	Phyllonorycter scabiosella	Terrestrial invertebrates	Moth
Pale shining brown	Polia bombycina	Terrestrial invertebrates	Moth
Fiery clearwing	Pyropteron chrysidiformis	Terrestrial invertebrates	Moth
Argent and sable	Rheumaptera hastata	Terrestrial invertebrates	Moth
Large wainscot	Rhizedra lutosa	Terrestrial invertebrates	Moth
Scarce aspen knot-horn	Sciota hostilis	Terrestrial invertebrates	Moth
Mullein wave	Scopula marginepunctata	Terrestrial invertebrates	Moth
Chalk carpet	Scotopteryx bipunctaria	Terrestrial invertebrates	Moth
Shaded broad-bar	Scotopteryx chenopodiata	Terrestrial invertebrates	Moth
Least owlet	Scythris siccella	Terrestrial invertebrates	Moth
Striped lychnis	Shargacucullia lychnitis	Terrestrial invertebrates	Moth
Black-veined moth	Siona lineata	Terrestrial invertebrates	Moth
White ermine	Spilosoma lubricipeda	Terrestrial invertebrates	Moth
Buff ermine	Spilosoma luteum	Terrestrial invertebrates	Moth
Sandhill pigmy moth	Stigmella zelleriella	Terrestrial invertebrates	Moth
Anomalous	Stilbia anomala	Terrestrial invertebrates	Moth
Slate sober moth	Syncopacma albipalpella	Terrestrial invertebrates	Moth
Western sober moth	Syncopacma suecicella	Terrestrial invertebrates	Moth
Sussex emerald	Thalera fimbrialis	Terrestrial invertebrates	Moth
Hedge rustic	Tholera cespitis	Terrestrial invertebrates	Moth
Feathered gothic	Tholera decimalis	Terrestrial invertebrates	Moth
Blood vein	Timandra comae	Terrestrial invertebrates	Moth
Pale eggar	Trichiura crataegi	Terrestrial invertebrates	Moth
Barred tooth-striped	Trichopteryx polycommata	Terrestrial invertebrates	Moth
Olive crescent	Trisateles emortualis	Terrestrial invertebrates	Moth
Cinnabar	Tyria jacobaeae	Terrestrial invertebrates	Moth
Four-spotted moth	Tyta luctuosa	Terrestrial invertebrates	Moth
Oak hook-tip	Watsonalla binaria	Terrestrial invertebrates	Moth
Dusky lemon sallow	Xanthia gilvago	Terrestrial invertebrates	Moth
Sallow	Xanthia icteritia	Terrestrial invertebrates	Moth
Red carpet	Xanthorhoe decoloraria	Terrestrial invertebrates	Moth
Dark-barred twin-spot carpet	Xanthorhoe ferrugata	Terrestrial invertebrates	Moth
Heath rustic	Xestia agathina	Terrestrial invertebrates	Moth
Northern dart	Xestia alpicola subsp. alpina	Terrestrial invertebrates	Moth
Neglected rustic	Xestia castanea	Terrestrial invertebrates	Moth
a stonefly	Brachyptera putata	Terrestrial invertebrates	Stonefly
a solitary wasp	Cerceris quadricincta	Terrestrial invertebrates	Wasp
5-banded tailed digger wasp	Cerceris quinquefasciata	Terrestrial invertebrates	Wasp
Ruby-tailed wasp	Chrysis fulgida	Terrestrial invertebrates	Wasp
Bloody spider-hunting wasp	Homonotus sanguinolentus	Terrestrial invertebrates	Wasp
Black-headed mason wasp	Odynerus melanocephalus	Terrestrial invertebrates	Wasp
Fen mason-wasp	Odynerus simillimus	Terrestrial invertebrates	Wasp
Purbeck mason wasp	Pseudepipona herrichii	Terrestrial invertebrates	Wasp
Golden lantern-spider	Agroeca cuprea	Terrestrial invertebrates	Spider
Great fox-spider	Alopecosa fabrilis	Terrestrial invertebrates	Spider
Dorset mesh-weaver	Altella lucida	Terrestrial invertebrates	Spider
Yellow-striped bear-spider	Arctosa fulvolineata	Terrestrial invertebrates	Spider
a money spider	Baryphyma duffeyi	Terrestrial invertebrates	Spider
a money spider	Centromerus serratus	Terrestrial invertebrates	Spider
Rosser's sac-spider	Clubiona rosserae	Terrestrial invertebrates	Spider
Small mesh-weaver	Dictyna pusilla	Terrestrial invertebrates	Spider
Silky gallows-spider	Dipoena inornata	Terrestrial invertebrates	Spider
Fen raft spider	Dolomedes plantarius	Terrestrial invertebrates	Spider
Ladybird spider	Eresus sandaliatus	Terrestrial invertebrates	Spider
Welch's money-spider	Erigone welchi	Terrestrial invertebrates	Spider
Cotton's amazon spider	Glyphesis cottonae	Terrestrial invertebrates	Spider
Heath grasper	Haplodrassus dalmatensis	Terrestrial invertebrates	Spider
Peus's long-back spider	Mecopisthes peusi	Terrestrial invertebrates	Spider
Thin weblet	Meioneta mollis	Terrestrial invertebrates	Spider
Midas tree-weaver	Midia midas	Terrestrial invertebrates	Spider
Broad groove-head spider	Monocephalus castaneipes	Terrestrial invertebrates	Spider
Horrid ground-weaver	Nothophantes horridus	Terrestrial invertebrates	Spider
Swamp lookout spider	Notioscopus sarcinatus	Terrestrial invertebrates	Spider
Southern crablet	Ozyptila nigrita	Terrestrial invertebrates	Spider
Sand running-spider	Philodromus fallax	Terrestrial invertebrates	Spider
Lichen running-spider	Philodromus margaritatus	Terrestrial invertebrates	Spider
Whelk-shell jumper	Pseudeuophrys obsoleta	Terrestrial invertebrates	Spider
Triangle hammock-spider	Saaristoa firma	Terrestrial invertebrates	Spider
Cloud-living spider	Semljicola caliginosus	Terrestrial invertebrates	Spider
Bend-bearing blunt-brow spider	Silometopus incurvatus	Terrestrial invertebrates	Spider
Sedge jumper	Calositticus caricis	Terrestrial invertebrates	Spider
Distinguished jumper	Attulus distinguendus (syn. Sitticus distinguendus)	Terrestrial invertebrates	Spider
Gentle groove-head spider	Tapinocyba mitis	Terrestrial invertebrates	Spider
Small-horned walckenaer	Walckenaeria corniculans	Terrestrial invertebrates	Spider
Turk's earth-centipede	Nothogeophilus turki	Terrestrial invertebrates	Centipede
Kentish snake millipede	Metaiulus pratensis	Terrestrial invertebrates	Millipede
Boring millipede	Polyzonium germanicum	Terrestrial invertebrates	Millipede
Sand pill-millipede	Trachysphaera lobata	Terrestrial invertebrates	Millipede
White-clawed crayfish	Austropotamobius pallipes	Terrestrial invertebrates	Crustacean
British cave shrimp	Niphargus glenniei	Terrestrial invertebrates	Crustacean
Tadpole shrimp	Triops cancriformis	Terrestrial invertebrates	Crustacean
Lagoon sand shrimp	Gammarus insensibilis	Marine invertebrates	Crustacean
Crayfish, crawfish or spiny lobster	Palinurus elephas	Marine invertebrates	Crustacean
Little whirlpool ram's-horn snail	Anisus vorticulus	Terrestrial invertebrates	Mollusc
Fan mussel	Atrina fragilis	Marine invertebrates	Mollusc
Thames ram's-horn snail	Gyraulus acronicus	Terrestrial invertebrates	Mollusc
Lagoon spire snail	Heleobia stagnorum	Terrestrial invertebrates	Mollusc
Freshwater pearl mussel	Margaritifera margaritifera	Terrestrial invertebrates	Mollusc
Swollen spire snail	Mercuria similis	Terrestrial invertebrates	Mollusc
Mud snail	Omphiscola glabra	Terrestrial invertebrates	Mollusc
Native oyster	Ostrea edulis	Marine invertebrates	Mollusc
Fine-lined pea mussel	Pisidium tenuilineatum	Terrestrial invertebrates	Mollusc
Gooseneck barnacle	Pollicipes pollicipes	Marine invertebrates	Mollusc
Depressed river mussel	Pseudanodonta complanata	Terrestrial invertebrates	Mollusc
Sandbowl snail	Quickella arenaria	Terrestrial invertebrates	Mollusc
The shining ram's-horn snail	Segmentina nitida	Terrestrial invertebrates	Mollusc
Witham orb mussel	Sphaerium solidum	Terrestrial invertebrates	Mollusc
Lagoon sea slug	Tenellia adspersa	Marine invertebrates	Mollusc
Cylindrical whorl snail	Truncatellina cylindrica	Terrestrial invertebrates	Mollusc
Large-mouthed valve snail	Valvata macrostoma	Terrestrial invertebrates	Mollusc
Narrow-mouthed whorl snail	Vertigo angustior	Terrestrial invertebrates	Mollusc
Round-mouthed whorl snail	Vertigo genesii	Terrestrial invertebrates	Mollusc
Geyer's whorl snail	Vertigo geyeri	Terrestrial invertebrates	Mollusc
Desmoulin's whorl snail	Vertigo moulinsiana	Terrestrial invertebrates	Mollusc
Lagoon sandworm	Armandia cirrhosa	Marine invertebrates	Worm
Jennings's ribbon-worm	Prostoma jenningsi	Terrestrial invertebrates	Worm
Crystal moss animal	Lophopus crystallinus	Terrestrial invertebrates	Bryozoan
Trembling sea-mat	Victorella pavida	Marine invertebrates	Bryozoan
Sea-fan anemone	Amphianthus dohrnii	Marine invertebrates	Cnidarian
Ivell's sea anemone	Edwardsia ivelli	Marine invertebrates	Cnidarian
Timid burrowing anemone	Edwardsia timida	Marine invertebrates	Cnidarian
Pink sea-fan	Eunicella verrucosa	Marine invertebrates	Cnidarian
Tall sea pen	Funiculina quadrangularis	Marine invertebrates	Cnidarian
Kaleidoscope jellyfish	Haliclystus auricula	Marine invertebrates	Cnidarian
Sunset cup coral	Leptopsammia pruvoti	Marine invertebrates	Cnidarian
a stalked jellyfish	Lucernariopsis campanulata	Marine invertebrates	Cnidarian
St John's jellyfish	Lucernariopsis cruxmelitensis	Marine invertebrates	Cnidarian
Starlet sea anemone	Nematostella vectensis	Marine invertebrates	Cnidarian
Brackish hydroid	Pachycordyle navis	Marine invertebrates	Cnidarian
an eyebright	Euphrasia officinalis subsp. monticola (= Euphrasia rostkoviana subsp. montana)	Vascular plants	Vascular plant
Pheasants-eye	Adonis annua	Vascular plants	Vascular plant
Ground-pine	Ajuga chamaepitys	Vascular plants	Vascular plant
Pyramidal bugle	Ajuga pyramidalis	Vascular plants	Vascular plant
a lady's mantle	Alchemilla acutiloba	Vascular plants	Vascular plant
a lady's mantle	Alchemilla micans	Vascular plants	Vascular plant
a lady's mantle	Alchemilla minima	Vascular plants	Vascular plant
a lady's mantle	Alchemilla monticola	Vascular plants	Vascular plant
a lady's mantle	Alchemilla subcrenata	Vascular plants	Vascular plant
Ribbon-leaved water-plantain	Alisma gramineum	Vascular plants	Vascular plant
Creeping marshwort	Apium repens	Vascular plants	Vascular plant
Tall thrift	Armeria maritima subsp. elongata	Vascular plants	Vascular plant
Field wormwood	Artemisia campestris	Vascular plants	Vascular plant
Wild asparagus	Asparagus prostratus	Vascular plants	Vascular plant
Purple milk-vetch	Astragalus danicus	Vascular plants	Vascular plant
Pedunculate sea-purslane	Atriplex pedunculata	Vascular plants	Vascular plant
Flat-sedge	Blysmus compressus	Vascular plants	Vascular plant
Interrupted brome	Bromus interruptus	Vascular plants	Vascular plant
Thorow-wax	Bupleurum rotundifolium	Vascular plants	Vascular plant
Slender hare's-ear	Bupleurum tenuissimum	Vascular plants	Vascular plant
Narrow small-reed	Calamagrostis stricta	Vascular plants	Vascular plant
Spreading bellflower	Campanula patula	Vascular plants	Vascular plant
Rampion bellflower	Campanula rapunculus	Vascular plants	Vascular plant
Starved wood-sedge	Carex depauperata	Vascular plants	Vascular plant
Divided sedge	Carex divisa	Vascular plants	Vascular plant
Rare spring-sedge	Carex ericetorum	Vascular plants	Vascular plant
Curved sedge	Carex maritima	Vascular plants	Vascular plant
True fox sedge	Carex vulpina	Vascular plants	Vascular plant
Caraway	Carum carvi	Vascular plants	Vascular plant
Red star-thistle	Centaurea calcitrapa	Vascular plants	Vascular plant
Cornflower	Centaurea cyanus	Vascular plants	Vascular plant
White helleborine	Cephalanthera damasonium	Vascular plants	Vascular plant
Narrow-leaved helleborine	Cephalanthera longifolia	Vascular plants	Vascular plant
Red helleborine	Cephalanthera rubra	Vascular plants	Vascular plant
Chamomile	Chamaemelum nobile	Vascular plants	Vascular plant
Upright goosefoot	Chenopodium urbicum	Vascular plants	Vascular plant
Stinking goosefoot	Chenopodium vulvaria	Vascular plants	Vascular plant
Yellow centaury	Cicendia filiformis	Vascular plants	Vascular plant
Basil thyme	Clinopodium acinos	Vascular plants	Vascular plant
Wood calamint	Clinopodium menthifolium	Vascular plants	Vascular plant
Lundy cabbage	Coincya wrightii	Vascular plants	Vascular plant
Strapwort	Corrigiola litoralis	Vascular plants	Vascular plant
Stinking hawk's-beard	Crepis foetida	Vascular plants	Vascular plant
Northern hawk's-beard	Crepis mollis	Vascular plants	Vascular plant
Green hound's-tongue	Cynoglossum germanicum	Vascular plants	Vascular plant
Brown galingale	Cyperus fuscus	Vascular plants	Vascular plant
Lady's slipper orchid	Cypripedium calceolus	Vascular plants	Vascular plant
an early marsh-orchid	Dactylorhiza incarnata subsp. ochroleuca	Vascular plants	Vascular plant
Frog orchid	Dactylorhiza viridis (= Coeloglossum viride)	Vascular plants	Vascular plant
Starfruit	Damasonium alisma	Vascular plants	Vascular plant
Deptford pink	Dianthus armeria	Vascular plants	Vascular plant
Crested buckler-fern	Dryopteris cristata	Vascular plants	Vascular plant
Lindisfarne helleborine	Epipactis sancta	Vascular plants	Vascular plant
Field eryngo	Eryngium campestre	Vascular plants	Vascular plant
Glandular eyebright	Euphrasia officinalis subsp. anglica	Vascular plants	Vascular plant
an eyebright	Euphrasia ostenfeldii	Vascular plants	Vascular plant
Chalk eyebright	Euphrasia pseudokerneri	Vascular plants	Vascular plant
an eyebright	Euphrasia rivularis	Vascular plants	Vascular plant
an eyebright	Euphrasia vigursii	Vascular plants	Vascular plant
Copse-bindweed	Fallopia dumetorum	Vascular plants	Vascular plant
Red-tipped cudweed	Filago lutescens	Vascular plants	Vascular plant
Broad-leaved cudweed	Filago pyramidata	Vascular plants	Vascular plant
Purple ramping-fumitory	Fumaria purpurea	Vascular plants	Vascular plant
Red hemp-nettle	Galeopsis angustifolia	Vascular plants	Vascular plant
Slender bedstraw	Galium pumilum	Vascular plants	Vascular plant
Corn cleavers	Galium tricornutum	Vascular plants	Vascular plant
Early gentian	Gentianella anglica	Vascular plants	Vascular plant
Field gentian	Gentianella campestris	Vascular plants	Vascular plant
Dune gentian	Gentianella uliginosa	Vascular plants	Vascular plant
Fringed gentian	Gentianopsis ciliata	Vascular plants	Vascular plant
Hoary rock-rose	Helianthemum oelandicum subsp. levigatum	Vascular plants	Vascular plant
Musk orchid	Herminium monorchis	Vascular plants	Vascular plant
Hawkweeds	Hieracium sect. Alpestria	Vascular plants	Vascular plant
Borrowdale hawkweed	Hieracium subgracilentipes	Vascular plants	Vascular plant
Sea barley	Hordeum marinum	Vascular plants	Vascular plant
Yellow bird's-nest	Hypopitys monotropa (= Monotropa hypopitys)	Vascular plants	Vascular plant
Yellow bird's-nest	Hypopitys monotropa subsp. hypophegea	Vascular plants	Vascular plant
Yellow bird's-nest	Hypopitys monotropa subsp. monotropa	Vascular plants	Vascular plant
Wild candytuft	Iberis amara	Vascular plants	Vascular plant
Coral-necklace	Illecebrum verticillatum	Vascular plants	Vascular plant
Pygmy rush	Juncus pygmaeus	Vascular plants	Vascular plant
Juniper	Juniperus communis	Vascular plants	Vascular plant
Juniper	Juniperus communis subsp. hemisphaerica	Vascular plants	Vascular plant
Least lettuce	Lactuca saligna	Vascular plants	Vascular plant
Cut-grass	Leersia oryzoides	Vascular plants	Vascular plant
Fen orchid	Liparis loeselii	Vascular plants	Vascular plant
Heath lobelia	Lobelia urens	Vascular plants	Vascular plant
Darnel	Lolium temulentum	Vascular plants	Vascular plant
Floating water plantain	Luronium natans	Vascular plants	Vascular plant
Fen wood-rush	Luzula pallescens (= Luzula pallidula)	Vascular plants	Vascular plant
Marsh clubmoss	Lycopodiella inundata	Vascular plants	Vascular plant
Grass-poly	Lythrum hyssopifolia	Vascular plants	Vascular plant
Sea stock	Matthiola sinuata	Vascular plants	Vascular plant
Crested cow-wheat	Melampyrum cristatum	Vascular plants	Vascular plant
Bastard balm	Melittis melissophyllum	Vascular plants	Vascular plant
Pennyroyal	Mentha pulegium	Vascular plants	Vascular plant
Cotswold pennycress	Microthlaspi perfoliatum (=Thlaspi perfoliatum)	Vascular plants	Vascular plant
Fine-leaved sandwort	Minuartia hybrida	Vascular plants	Vascular plant
Grape-hyacinth	Muscari neglectum	Vascular plants	Vascular plant
Slender naiad	Najas flexilis	Vascular plants	Vascular plant
Holly-leaved naiad	Najas marina	Vascular plants	Vascular plant
Tubular water-dropwort	Oenanthe fistulosa	Vascular plants	Vascular plant
Fly orchid	Ophrys insectifera	Vascular plants	Vascular plant
Man orchid	Orchis anthropophora (= Aceras anthropophora)	Vascular plants	Vascular plant
Monkey orchid	Orchis simia	Vascular plants	Vascular plant
Burnt orchid	Orchis ustulata (= Neotinea ustulata)	Vascular plants	Vascular plant
Oxtongue broomrape	Orobanche picridis (= Orobanche artemisiae-campestris)	Vascular plants	Vascular plant
Spiked rampion	Phyteuma spicatum	Vascular plants	Vascular plant
Pillwort	Pilularia globulifera	Vascular plants	Vascular plant
Lesser butterfly-orchid	Platanthera bifolia	Vascular plants	Vascular plant
Glaucous meadow-grass	Poa glauca	Vascular plants	Vascular plant
Holly-fern	Polystichum lonchitis	Vascular plants	Vascular plant
Sharp-leaved pondweed	Potamogeton acutifolius	Vascular plants	Vascular plant
Grass-wrack pondweed	Potamogeton compressus	Vascular plants	Vascular plant
Small-white orchid	Pseudorchis albida	Vascular plants	Vascular plant
Borrer's saltmarsh-grass	Puccinellia fasciculata	Vascular plants	Vascular plant
Small fleabane	Pulicaria vulgaris	Vascular plants	Vascular plant
Suffolk lungwort	Pulmonaria obscura	Vascular plants	Vascular plant
Pasqueflower	Pulsatilla vulgaris	Vascular plants	Vascular plant
Plymouth pear	Pyrus cordata	Vascular plants	Vascular plant
Corn buttercup	Ranunculus arvensis	Vascular plants	Vascular plant
Three-lobed water-crowfoot	Ranunculus tripartitus	Vascular plants	Vascular plant
Shore dock	Rumex rupestris	Vascular plants	Vascular plant
Downy willow	Salix lapponum	Vascular plants	Vascular plant
Prickly saltwort	Salsola kali subsp. kali	Vascular plants	Vascular plant
Yellow marsh saxifrage	Saxifraga hirculus	Vascular plants	Vascular plant
Shepherd's needle	Scandix pecten-veneris	Vascular plants	Vascular plant
Triangular club-rush	Schoenoplectus triqueter	Vascular plants	Vascular plant
Round-headed club-rush	Scirpoides holoschoenus	Vascular plants	Vascular plant
Annual knawel	Scleranthus annuus	Vascular plants	Vascular plant
Prostrate perennial knawel	Scleranthus perennis subsp. prostratus	Vascular plants	Vascular plant
Fen ragwort	Senecio paludosus	Vascular plants	Vascular plant
Small-flowered catchfly	Silene gallica	Vascular plants	Vascular plant
Spanish catchfly	Silene otites	Vascular plants	Vascular plant
Greater water parsnip	Sium latifolium	Vascular plants	Vascular plant
a whitebeam	Sorbus bristoliensis	Vascular plants	Vascular plant
a whitebeam	Sorbus eminens	Vascular plants	Vascular plant
a whitebeam	Sorbus subcuneata	Vascular plants	Vascular plant
a whitebeam	Sorbus vexans	Vascular plants	Vascular plant
a whitebeam	Sorbus wilmottiana	Vascular plants	Vascular plant
Small cord-grass	Spartina maritima	Vascular plants	Vascular plant
Marsh stitchwort	Stellaria palustris	Vascular plants	Vascular plant
Field fleawort	Tephroseris integrifolia subsp. integrifolia (= Senecio integrifolius)	Vascular plants	Vascular plant
Water germander	Teucrium scordium	Vascular plants	Vascular plant
Spreading hedge parsley	Torilis arvensis	Vascular plants	Vascular plant
Tower mustard	Turritis glabra (= Arabis glabra)	Vascular plants	Vascular plant
Broad-fruited corn salad	Valerianella rimosa	Vascular plants	Vascular plant
Fingered speedwell	Veronica triphyllos	Vascular plants	Vascular plant
Spring speedwell	Veronica verna	Vascular plants	Vascular plant
Pale dog-violet	Viola lactea	Vascular plants	Vascular plant
Fen violet	Viola persicifolia	Vascular plants	Vascular plant
Oblong woodsia	Woodsia ilvensis	Vascular plants	Vascular plant
Triangular pygmy-moss	Acaulon triquetrum	Non-vascular plants	Bryophyte
Long-leaved tail-moss	Anomodon longifolius	Non-vascular plants	Bryophyte
Carrion-moss	Aplodon wormskjoldii	Non-vascular plants	Bryophyte
Lesser smoothcap	Atrichum angustatum	Non-vascular plants	Bryophyte
Matted bryum	Bryum calophyllum	Non-vascular plants	Bryophyte
Round-leaved bryum	Bryum cyclophyllum	Non-vascular plants	Bryophyte
Welsh thread-moss	Bryum gemmiparum	Non-vascular plants	Bryophyte
Knowlton's thread-moss	Bryum knowltonii	Non-vascular plants	Bryophyte
Baltic bryum	Bryum marratii	Non-vascular plants	Bryophyte
Saltmarsh thread-moss	Bryum salinum	Non-vascular plants	Bryophyte
Sea bryum	Bryum warneum	Non-vascular plants	Bryophyte
Chalk threadwort	Cephaloziella baumgartneri	Non-vascular plants	Bryophyte
Entire threadwort	Cephaloziella calyculata	Non-vascular plants	Bryophyte
Toothed threadwort	Cephaloziella dentata	Non-vascular plants	Bryophyte
Lobed threadwort	Cephaloziella integerrima	Non-vascular plants	Bryophyte
Greater copperwort	Cephaloziella nicholsonii	Non-vascular plants	Bryophyte
Scarce redshank	Ceratodon conicus	Non-vascular plants	Bryophyte
Multi-fruited river moss	Cryphaea lamyana (=Dendrocryphaea lamyana)	Non-vascular plants	Bryophyte
Bright-green cave-moss	Cyclodictyon laetevirens	Non-vascular plants	Bryophyte
Waved fork-moss	Dicranum bergeri (=D. undulatum)	Non-vascular plants	Bryophyte
Rusty fork-moss	Dicranum spurium	Non-vascular plants	Bryophyte
Glaucous beard-moss	Didymodon glaucus	Non-vascular plants	Bryophyte
Sausage beard-moss	Didymodon tomaculosus	Non-vascular plants	Bryophyte
Cornish path moss	Ditrichum cornubicum	Non-vascular plants	Bryophyte
Lead-moss	Ditrichum plumbicola	Non-vascular plants	Bryophyte
Awl-leaved ditrichum	Ditrichum subulatum	Non-vascular plants	Bryophyte
Dumortier's liverwort	Dumortiera hirsuta	Non-vascular plants	Bryophyte
Clustered earth-moss	Ephemerum cohaerens	Non-vascular plants	Bryophyte
Portuguese pocket-moss	Fissidens curvatus	Non-vascular plants	Bryophyte
Large atlantic pocket-moss	Fissidens serrulatus	Non-vascular plants	Bryophyte
Pitted frillwort	Fossombronia foveolata	Non-vascular plants	Bryophyte
Pretty cord-moss	Funaria pulchella (=Entosthodon pulchellus)	Non-vascular plants	Bryophyte
Hedgehog grimmia	Grimmia crinita	Non-vascular plants	Bryophyte
Brown grimmia	Grimmia elongata	Non-vascular plants	Bryophyte
Lesser squirrel-tail moss	Habrodon perpusillus	Non-vascular plants	Bryophyte
Incurved feather-moss	Homomallium incurvatum	Non-vascular plants	Bryophyte
Marsh earwort	Jamesoniella undulifolia syn. of Biantheridion undulifolium	Non-vascular plants	Bryophyte
Long-leaved flapwort	Jungermannia leiantha (=Liochlaena lanceolata)	Non-vascular plants	Bryophyte
Fen notchwort	Leiocolea rutheana	Non-vascular plants	Bryophyte
Atlantic lejeunea	Lejeunea mandonii	Non-vascular plants	Bryophyte
Thatch moss	Leptodontium gemmascens	Non-vascular plants	Bryophyte
Large-celled flapwort	Lophozia capitata	Non-vascular plants	Bryophyte
Western rustwort	Marsupella profunda	Non-vascular plants	Bryophyte
Millimetre moss	Micromitrium tenerum	Non-vascular plants	Bryophyte
Slender thread-moss	Orthodontium gracile	Non-vascular plants	Bryophyte
Pale bristle-moss	Orthotrichum pallens	Non-vascular plants	Bryophyte
Dwarf bristle-moss	Orthotrichum pumilum	Non-vascular plants	Bryophyte
Veilwort	Pallavicinia lyellii	Non-vascular plants	Bryophyte
Petalwort	Petalophyllum ralfsii	Non-vascular plants	Bryophyte
Bog apple-moss	Philonotis marchica	Non-vascular plants	Bryophyte
Norfolk bladder-moss	Physcomitrium eurystomum	Non-vascular plants	Bryophyte
Round-leaved feather-moss	Rhynchostegium rotundifolium	Non-vascular plants	Bryophyte
Scarce turf-moss	Rhytidiadelphus subpinnatus	Non-vascular plants	Bryophyte
Lizard crystalwort	Riccia bifurca	Non-vascular plants	Bryophyte
Channelled crystalwort	Riccia canaliculata	Non-vascular plants	Bryophyte
Black crystalwort	Riccia nigrella	Non-vascular plants	Bryophyte
Tongue-leaf copper-moss	Scopelophila cataractae	Non-vascular plants	Bryophyte
Water rock-bristle	Seligeria carniolica	Non-vascular plants	Bryophyte
Blackwort	Southbya nigrella	Non-vascular plants	Bryophyte
Texas balloonwort	Sphaerocarpos texanus	Non-vascular plants	Bryophyte
Baltic bog-moss	Sphagnum balticum	Non-vascular plants	Bryophyte
Rugged collar-moss	Splachnum vasculosum	Non-vascular plants	Bryophyte
Irish threadwort	Telaranea nematodes (=T. europaea)	Non-vascular plants	Bryophyte
Derbyshire feather-moss	Thamnobryum angustifolium	Non-vascular plants	Bryophyte
Yorkshire feather-moss	Thamnobryum cataractarum	Non-vascular plants	Bryophyte
Flamingo moss	Tortula cernua	Non-vascular plants	Bryophyte
Wedge-leaved screw-moss	Tortula cuneifolia	Non-vascular plants	Bryophyte
Freiberg's screw-moss	Tortula freibergii	Non-vascular plants	Bryophyte
Chalk screw-moss	Tortula vahliana	Non-vascular plants	Bryophyte
Wilson's pottia	Tortula wilsonii	Non-vascular plants	Bryophyte
Curly beardless-moss	Weissia condensa	Non-vascular plants	Bryophyte
Levier's beardless-moss	Weissia levieri	Non-vascular plants	Bryophyte
	Weissia multicapsularis	Non-vascular plants	Bryophyte
Spreading-leaved beardless-moss	Weissia squarrosa	Non-vascular plants	Bryophyte
Sterile beardless-moss	Weissia sterilis	Non-vascular plants	Bryophyte
Knothole moss	Zygodon forsteri	Non-vascular plants	Bryophyte
Nowell's limestone moss	Zygodon gracilis	Non-vascular plants	Bryophyte
	Acarospora subrufula	Fungi (including lichens)	Lichen
	Anaptychia ciliaris subsp. ciliaris	Fungi (including lichens)	Lichen
	Arthonia anglica	Fungi (including lichens)	Lichen
	Arthonia atlantica	Fungi (including lichens)	Lichen
	Arthonia invadens	Fungi (including lichens)	Lichen
	Bacidia circumspecta	Fungi (including lichens)	Lichen
	Bacidia incompta	Fungi (including lichens)	Lichen
	Bacidia subincompta	Fungi (including lichens)	Lichen
	Bacidia subturgidula	Fungi (including lichens)	Lichen
	Belonia calcicola	Fungi (including lichens)	Lichen
	Biatorella fossarum	Fungi (including lichens)	Lichen
	Biatoridium monasteriense	Fungi (including lichens)	Lichen
	Blarneya hibernica (= Tylophoron hibernica)	Fungi (including lichens)	Lichen
	Bryoria nadvornikiana	Fungi (including lichens)	Lichen
	Bryoria smithii	Fungi (including lichens)	Lichen
Starry breck-lichen	Buellia asterella	Fungi (including lichens)	Lichen
	Buellia hyperbolica	Fungi (including lichens)	Lichen
	Buellia violaceofusca	Fungi (including lichens)	Lichen
	Calicium adspersum	Fungi (including lichens)	Lichen
	Calicium corynellum	Fungi (including lichens)	Lichen
	Caloplaca aractina	Fungi (including lichens)	Lichen
	Caloplaca atroflava	Fungi (including lichens)	Lichen
	Caloplaca flavorubescens	Fungi (including lichens)	Lichen
	Caloplaca herbidella	Fungi (including lichens)	Lichen
	Caloplaca lucifuga	Fungi (including lichens)	Lichen
Orange-fruited elm-lichen	Caloplaca luteoalba	Fungi (including lichens)	Lichen
	Caloplaca virescens	Fungi (including lichens)	Lichen
	Catapyrenium michelii (= Placidium michelii)	Fungi (including lichens)	Lichen
Tree catapyrenium	Catapyrenium psoromoides	Fungi (including lichens)	Lichen
	Catillaria alba (= Biatora veteranorum)	Fungi (including lichens)	Lichen
	Chaenotheca gracilenta	Fungi (including lichens)	Lichen
	Cladonia convoluta	Fungi (including lichens)	Lichen
Reindeer lichen	Cladonia mediterranea	Fungi (including lichens)	Lichen
	Cladonia peziziformis	Fungi (including lichens)	Lichen
	Cliostomum corrugatum	Fungi (including lichens)	Lichen
River jelly lichen	Collema dichotomum	Fungi (including lichens)	Lichen
	Collema fragile	Fungi (including lichens)	Lichen
	Collema fragrans	Fungi (including lichens)	Lichen
	Collema latzelii	Fungi (including lichens)	Lichen
	Cryptolechia carneolutea	Fungi (including lichens)	Lichen
	Endocarpon adscendens	Fungi (including lichens)	Lichen
New forest beech-lichen	Enterographa elaborata	Fungi (including lichens)	Lichen
	Enterographa sorediata	Fungi (including lichens)	Lichen
	Fulgensia fulgens	Fungi (including lichens)	Lichen
	Fuscopannaria sampaiana	Fungi (including lichens)	Lichen
	Graphina pauciloculata	Fungi (including lichens)	Lichen
Elm's gyalecta	Gyalecta ulmi	Fungi (including lichens)	Lichen
Ciliate strap-lichen	Heterodermia leucomela	Fungi (including lichens)	Lichen
	Heterodermia speciosa	Fungi (including lichens)	Lichen
	Lecania chlorotiza	Fungi (including lichens)	Lichen
	Lecanographa amylacea	Fungi (including lichens)	Lichen
Tarn lecanora	Lecanora achariana	Fungi (including lichens)	Lichen
	Lecanora quercicola	Fungi (including lichens)	Lichen
	Lecanora sublivescens	Fungi (including lichens)	Lichen
	Lecidea erythrophaea	Fungi (including lichens)	Lichen
Copper lecidea	Lecidea inops	Fungi (including lichens)	Lichen
	Leptogium cochleatum	Fungi (including lichens)	Lichen
	Leptogium saturninum	Fungi (including lichens)	Lichen
	Megalaria laureri	Fungi (including lichens)	Lichen
	Megalospora tuberculosa	Fungi (including lichens)	Lichen
	Melaspilea lentiginosa	Fungi (including lichens)	Lichen
	Opegrapha prosodea	Fungi (including lichens)	Lichen
	Opegrapha subelevata	Fungi (including lichens)	Lichen
	Parmeliella testacea	Fungi (including lichens)	Lichen
	Parmelina quercina (= P. carporrhizans)	Fungi (including lichens)	Lichen
	Parmotrema robustum	Fungi (including lichens)	Lichen
Pixie gowns	Peltigera venosa	Fungi (including lichens)	Lichen
	Pertusaria velata	Fungi (including lichens)	Lichen
	Phaeophyscia endococcina	Fungi (including lichens)	Lichen
Southern grey physcia	Physcia tribacioides	Fungi (including lichens)	Lichen
	Poeltinula cerebrina	Fungi (including lichens)	Lichen
	Porina effilata	Fungi (including lichens)	Lichen
	Porina hibernica	Fungi (including lichens)	Lichen
	Porina sudetica	Fungi (including lichens)	Lichen
	Pseudocyphellaria aurata	Fungi (including lichens)	Lichen
	Pseudocyphellaria intricata	Fungi (including lichens)	Lichen
	Pyrenula nitida	Fungi (including lichens)	Lichen
	Ramonia chrysophaea	Fungi (including lichens)	Lichen
	Ramonia dictyospora	Fungi (including lichens)	Lichen
	Ramonia nigra	Fungi (including lichens)	Lichen
	Rinodina isidioides	Fungi (including lichens)	Lichen
	Schismatomma graphidioides	Fungi (including lichens)	Lichen
	Sclerophora pallida	Fungi (including lichens)	Lichen
Serpentine solenopsora	Solenopsora liparina	Fungi (including lichens)	Lichen
Scaly breck-lichen	Squamarina lentigera	Fungi (including lichens)	Lichen
	Stereocaulon delisei	Fungi (including lichens)	Lichen
	Stereocaulon symphycheilum	Fungi (including lichens)	Lichen
	Strigula stigmatella var. stigmatella	Fungi (including lichens)	Lichen
	Synalissa symphorea (= S. ramulosa)	Fungi (including lichens)	Lichen
Golden hair lichen	Teloschistes flavicans	Fungi (including lichens)	Lichen
	Toninia physaroides	Fungi (including lichens)	Lichen
	Toninia sedifolia	Fungi (including lichens)	Lichen
String-of-sausages lichen	Usnea articulata	Fungi (including lichens)	Lichen
Witches’ whiskers	Usnea florida	Fungi (including lichens)	Lichen
	Verrucaria xyloxena	Fungi (including lichens)	Lichen
	Wadeana dendrographa	Fungi (including lichens)	Lichen
	Wadeana minuta	Fungi (including lichens)	Lichen
Fragile amanita	Amanita friabilis	Fungi (including lichens)	Fungus (non lichenised)
Marsh honey fungus	Armillaria ectypa	Fungi (including lichens)	Fungus (non lichenised)
Drab tooth	Bankera fuligineoalba	Fungi (including lichens)	Fungus (non lichenised)
Sandy stiltball	Battarrea phalloides	Fungi (including lichens)	Fungus (non lichenised)
Constant bolete	Boletus immutatus	Fungi (including lichens)	Fungus (non lichenised)
The pretender	Boletus pseudoregius	Fungi (including lichens)	Fungus (non lichenised)
Royal bolete	Boletus regius	Fungi (including lichens)	Fungus (non lichenised)
Oldrose bolete	Boletus rhodopurpureus	Fungi (including lichens)	Fungus (non lichenised)
Brawny bolete	Boletus torosus	Fungi (including lichens)	Fungus (non lichenised)
Fen puffball	Bovista paludosa	Fungi (including lichens)	Fungus (non lichenised)
Orange chanterelle	Cantharellus friesii	Fungi (including lichens)	Fungus (non lichenised)
Blackening chanterelle	Cantharellus melanoxeros	Fungi (including lichens)	Fungus (non lichenised)
Flea's ear	Chlorencoelia versiformis	Fungi (including lichens)	Fungus (non lichenised)
Wintergreen rust	Chrysomyxa pirolata	Fungi (including lichens)	Fungus (non lichenised)
Woolly rosette	Cotylidia pannosa	Fungi (including lichens)	Fungus (non lichenised)
Big blue pinkgill	Entoloma bloxamii	Fungi (including lichens)	Fungus (non lichenised)
Berkeley's earthstar	Geastrum berkeleyi	Fungi (including lichens)	Fungus (non lichenised)
Weathered earthstar	Geastrum corollinum	Fungi (including lichens)	Fungus (non lichenised)
Elegant earthstar	Geastrum elegans	Fungi (including lichens)	Fungus (non lichenised)
Tiny earthstar	Geastrum minimum	Fungi (including lichens)	Fungus (non lichenised)
Dark-purple earthtongue	Geoglossum atropurpureum	Fungi (including lichens)	Fungus (non lichenised)
Coral tooth	Hericium coralloides	Fungi (including lichens)	Fungus (non lichenised)
Bearded tooth	Hericium erinaceus	Fungi (including lichens)	Fungus (non lichenised)
Marram oyster	Hohenbuehelia culmicola	Fungi (including lichens)	Fungus (non lichenised)
Zoned tooth	Hydnellum concrescens	Fungi (including lichens)	Fungus (non lichenised)
Mealy tooth	Hydnellum ferrugineum	Fungi (including lichens)	Fungus (non lichenised)
Ridged tooth	Hydnellum scrobiculatum	Fungi (including lichens)	Fungus (non lichenised)
Velvet tooth	Hydnellum spongiosipes	Fungi (including lichens)	Fungus (non lichenised)
Date waxcap	Hygrocybe spadicea	Fungi (including lichens)	Fungus (non lichenised)
Rosy woodwax	Hygrophorus pudorinus	Fungi (including lichens)	Fungus (non lichenised)
Willow gloves	Hypocreopsis lichenoides	Fungi (including lichens)	Fungus (non lichenised)
Hazel gloves	Hypocreopsis rhododendri	Fungi (including lichens)	Fungus (non lichenised)
Gilded domecap	Lyophyllum favrei	Fungi (including lichens)	Fungus (non lichenised)
Olive earthtongue	Microglossum olivaceum	Fungi (including lichens)	Fungus (non lichenised)
Beautiful bonnet	Mycena renati	Fungi (including lichens)	Fungus (non lichenised)
Pepper pot	Myriostoma coliforme	Fungi (including lichens)	Fungus (non lichenised)
Fused tooth	Phellodon confluens	Fungi (including lichens)	Fungus (non lichenised)
Grey tooth	Phellodon melaleucus	Fungi (including lichens)	Fungus (non lichenised)
Black tooth	Phellodon niger	Fungi (including lichens)	Fungus (non lichenised)
Woolly tooth	Phellodon tomentosus	Fungi (including lichens)	Fungus (non lichenised)
Conifer scalycap	Pholiota astragalina	Fungi (including lichens)	Fungus (non lichenised)
Golden gilled bolete	Phylloporus pelletieri	Fungi (including lichens)	Fungus (non lichenised)
Oak polypore	Piptoporus quercinus	Fungi (including lichens)	Fungus (non lichenised)
Zoned rosette	Podoscypha multizonata	Fungi (including lichens)	Fungus (non lichenised)
Nail fungus	Poronia punctata	Fungi (including lichens)	Fungus (non lichenised)
Bladder-seed rust	Puccinia physospermi	Fungi (including lichens)	Fungus (non lichenised)
Scorzonera rust	Puccinia scorzonerae	Fungi (including lichens)	Fungus (non lichenised)
Bastard-toadflax rust	Puccinia thesii	Fungi (including lichens)	Fungus (non lichenised)
Bitter tooth	Sarcodon scabrosus	Fungi (including lichens)	Fungus (non lichenised)
Scaly tooth	Sarcodon squamosus	Fungi (including lichens)	Fungus (non lichenised)
Orchard tooth	Sarcodontia crocea	Fungi (including lichens)	Fungus (non lichenised)
Violet crowncup	Sarcosphaera coronaria	Fungi (including lichens)	Fungus (non lichenised)
Carroty false truffle	Stephanospora caroticolor	Fungi (including lichens)	Fungus (non lichenised)
Sweet greyling	Tephrocybe osmophora	Fungi (including lichens)	Fungus (non lichenised)
Frogbit smut	Tracya hydrocharidis	Fungi (including lichens)	Fungus (non lichenised)
Mulberry brain	Tremella moriformis	Fungi (including lichens)	Fungus (non lichenised)
Ashen coral	Tremellodendropsis tuberosa	Fungi (including lichens)	Fungus (non lichenised)
Scaly stalkball	Tulostoma melanocyclum	Fungi (including lichens)	Fungus (non lichenised)
Colchicum smut	Urocystis colchici	Fungi (including lichens)	Fungus (non lichenised)
Bird's-eye primrose smut	Urocystis primulicola	Fungi (including lichens)	Fungus (non lichenised)
Felwort rust	Uromyces gentianae	Fungi (including lichens)	Fungus (non lichenised)
Bearded red seaweed	Anotrichium barbatum	Non-vascular plants	Alga
a red seaweed	Cruoria cruoriaeformis	Non-vascular plants	Alga
a red seaweed	Dermocorynus montagnei	Non-vascular plants	Alga
Coral maërl	Lithothamnion corallioides	Non-vascular plants	Alga
Peacock's tail	Padina pavonica	Non-vascular plants	Alga
Common maërl	Phymatolithon calcareum	Non-vascular plants	Alga
Baltic stonewort	Chara baltica	Non-vascular plants	Stonewort
Bearded stonewort	Chara canescens	Non-vascular plants	Stonewort
Convergent stonewort	Chara connivens	Non-vascular plants	Stonewort
Intermediate stonewort	Chara intermedia	Non-vascular plants	Stonewort
Foxtail stonewort	Lamprothamnium papulosum	Non-vascular plants	Stonewort
Dwarf stonewort	Nitella tenuissima	Non-vascular plants	Stonewort
Starry stonewort	Nitellopsis obtusa	Non-vascular plants	Stonewort
Tassel stonewort	Tolypella intricata	Non-vascular plants	Stonewort
Great tassel stonewort	Tolypella prolifera	Non-vascular plants	Stonewort

== See also ==
- List of United Kingdom Biodiversity Action Plan species
- List of habitats of principal importance in Wales
