= Amara fusca =

Scientific classification
- Kingdom: Animalia
- Phylum: Arthropoda
- Class: Insecta
- Order: Coleoptera
- Suborder: Adephaga
- Family: Carabidae
- Genus: Amara
- Species: A. fusca

Binomial name
- Amara fusca Dejean, 1828

Species of beetle

Amara fusca, sometimes known as the wormwood moonshiner, is a species of ground beetles in the family Carabidae.

== Discovery ==
The species was re-discovered in West Suffolk on September 6, 1993. They can also be found in Crymlyn Burrows on the Glamorgan coast. Before this the species have not been seen in Britain since 1942.

== Description ==
The colour of the beetle is black.

== Habitat ==
The species lives in a vegetated, and dry soil. It also can be found in sandy and gravelly soil, such as headlands and sand dunes. The larva is a predator. Adult beetles prefer the seeds of Artemisia campestris. The species are common in autumn, usually from 6 September to 13 October. Sometimes they might appear from 15 May to 14 June.
