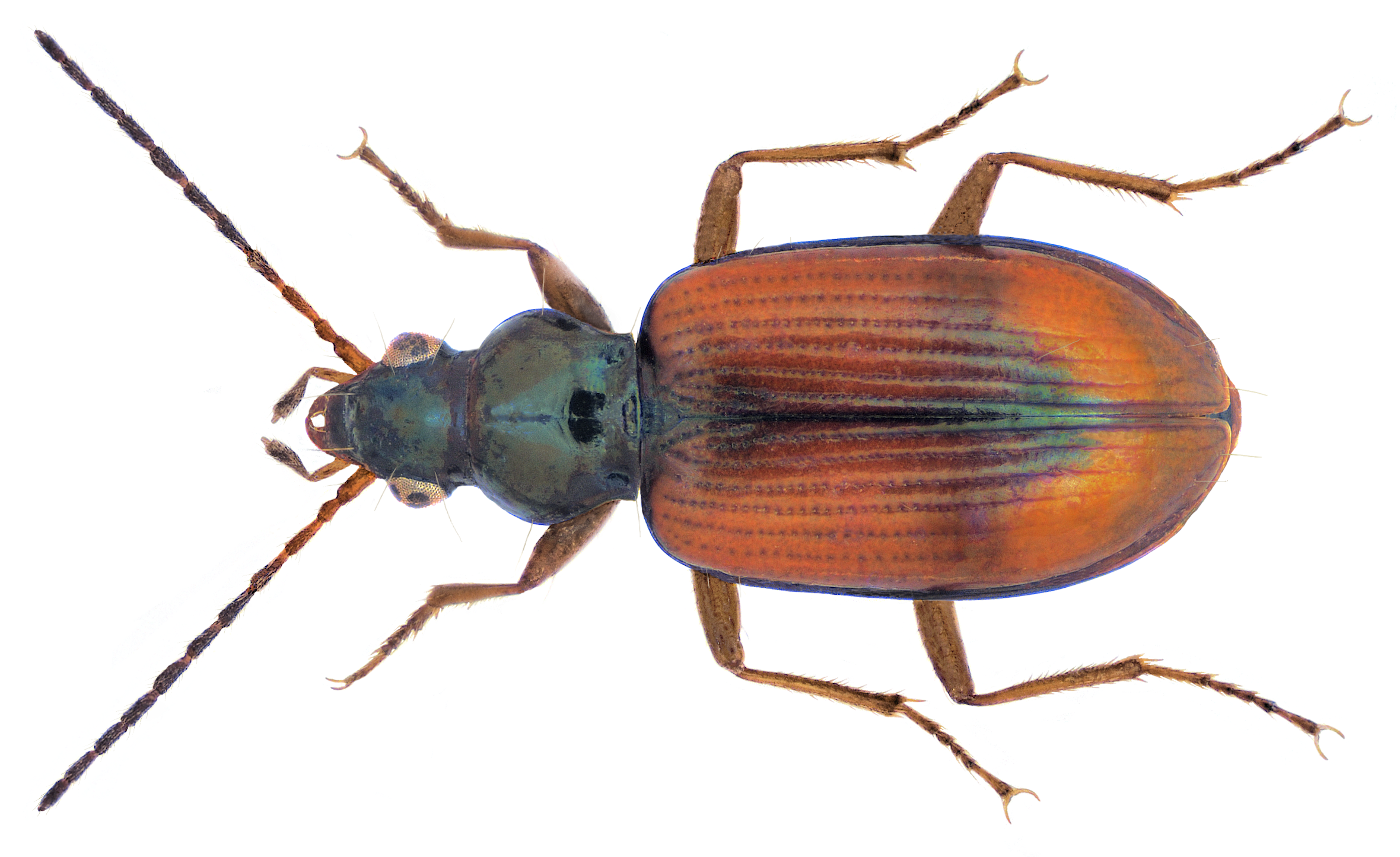

Scientific classification
- Domain: Eukaryota
- Kingdom: Animalia
- Phylum: Arthropoda
- Class: Insecta
- Order: Coleoptera
- Suborder: Adephaga
- Family: Carabidae
- Genus: Bembidion
- Species: B. testaceum

Binomial name
- Bembidion testaceum (Duftschmid, 1812)

= Bembidion testaceum =

Species of beetle

Bembidion testaceum (also known as river shingle beetle) is a small, fast-moving water beetle in the Trechinae subfamily that can be found in Austria, Benelux, Bulgaria, Czech Republic, France, Germany, Great Britain, Greece, Hungary, Liechtenstein, Poland, Romania, Slovakia, Spain, Switzerland, Ukraine, and all states of former Yugoslavia.

== Description ==
The species is brown coloured and have a length of 4.5–5.5 millimetres (0.18–0.22 in). The distinctive feature of this kind of species is that it has a dark head and pronotum which has a greenish outline. The wing cases are brownish-red and have almost no reddish spots on them.

== Habitat and ecology ==
The species can be found on sand and gravel, usually by sea side.

== Threat status ==
The species is considered to be Nationally Scarce in Great Britain. It used to be common in England, Wales and southern Scotland.

== Conservation ==
Due to its decline in Great Britain the species therefore are protected by UK Biodiversity Action Plan. The decline happen to be from habitat loss which is due to the invasion of Himalayan Balsam and floods.
