= Chrysomyxa pirolata =

Scientific classification
- Domain: Eukaryota
- Kingdom: Fungi
- Division: Basidiomycota
- Class: Pucciniomycetes
- Order: Pucciniales
- Family: Coleosporiaceae
- Genus: Chrysomyxa
- Species: C. pirolata

Binomial name
- Chrysomyxa pirolata Wint.

Species of fungus

The spruce cone rust, caused by the rust fungus Chrysomyxa pirolata Wint., affects spruces in 3 continents, including white spruce in Canada (Hiratsuka 1987). Alternate hosts of the fungus are several species among 3 genera of wintergreen: Pyrola spp., Orthilia spp., and Moneses spp. (Ziller 1974, Sutherland et al. 1984). Diseased cones open prematurely and orange-yellow aeciospores are sometimes produced in such quantity as to color the forest floor and lake surfaces. Up to half of a cone crop can be affected, and most of the affected cones do not produce viable seed. Some localities commonly experience damage to 20% to 30% of cone crops (Hiratsuka 1987), a factor to be considered in the siting of seed orchards.
