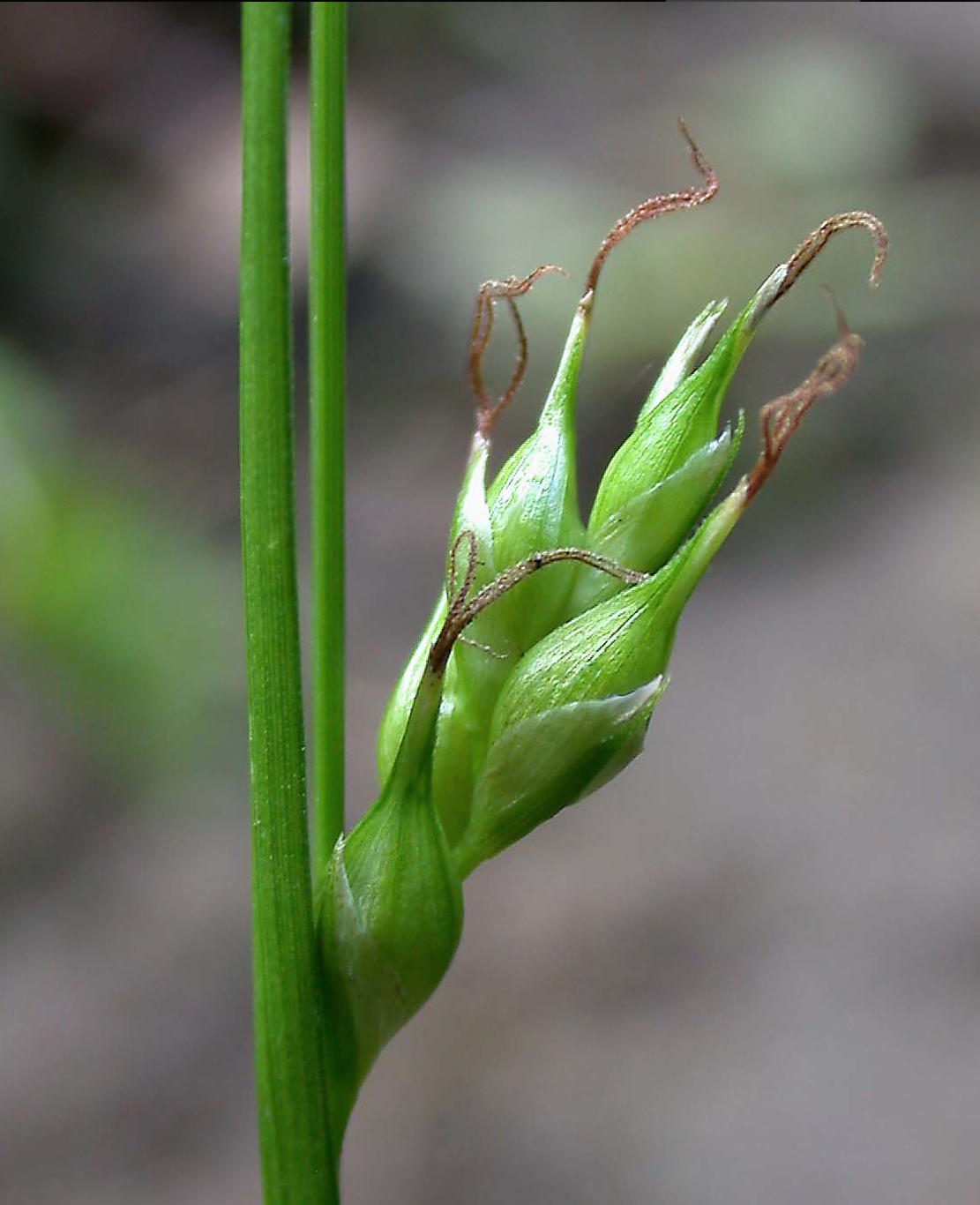

Scientific classification
- Kingdom: Plantae
- Clade: Tracheophytes
- Clade: Angiosperms
- Clade: Monocots
- Clade: Commelinids
- Order: Poales
- Family: Cyperaceae
- Genus: Carex
- Species: C. depauperata

Binomial name
- Carex depauperata Curtis

= Carex depauperata =

Species of grass-like plant

Carex depauperata (starved wood-sedge) is a rare species of sedge native to parts of Europe. The plant has been virtually extinct in the United Kingdom since the 1940s.

In 2010, following a successful reintroduction at Charterhouse School, staff at Wakehurst Place Garden, West Sussex, announced that the plant was to be reintroduced to a second, undisclosed location in Surrey.
