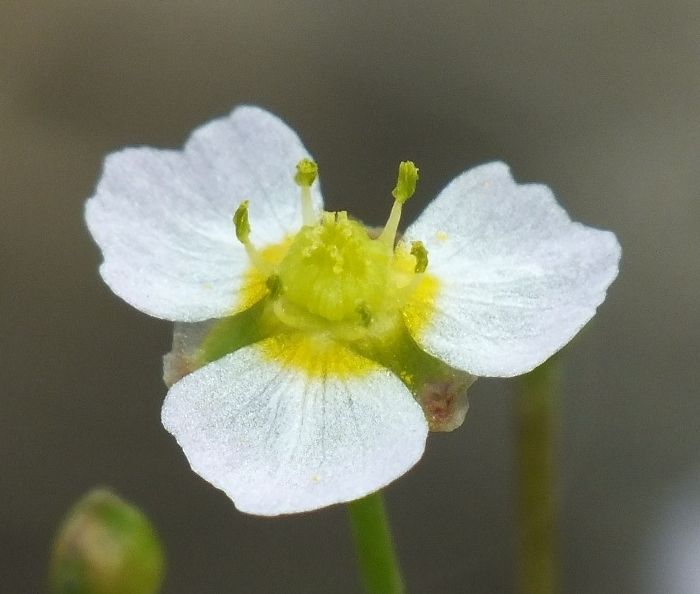

Conservation status
- Data Deficient (IUCN 3.1)

- Secure (NatureServe)

Scientific classification
- Kingdom: Plantae
- Clade: Tracheophytes
- Clade: Angiosperms
- Clade: Monocots
- Order: Alismatales
- Family: Alismataceae
- Genus: Alisma
- Species: A. gramineum

Binomial name
- Alisma gramineum Lej., 1811

Synonyms
- Alisma geyeri

= Alisma gramineum =

Species of plant

Alisma gramineum is a small aquatic plant in the water-plantain family. It has several common names including narrowleaf water-plantain, ribbonleaf water-plantain or ribbon-leaved water-plantain, and grass-leaved water-plantain. It grows in mud or submerged in shallow fresh or brackish water in marshy areas.

== Description ==
The leaves and tiny purple-tinted white flowers may be submersed or not. When the flowers grow underwater they are cleistogamous, meaning they stay closed and self-pollinate. When the flowers grow above water they open. The leaves above the surface are stiff and wide, but submerged leaves are ribbon-like. The fruit is a ring of dry nutlets. Reproduction is by seed or from division of the corm.

== Distribution and habitat ==
Alisma gramineum is widespread across temperate and subarctic portions of Asia and Europe and North Africa from France and Libya to China and Yakutsk. It is reported from much of Canada from British Columbia to Quebec, as well as most of the western United States plus New York, Vermont and Virginia. This is an endangered and protected species in the United Kingdom. It was first found in Britain in Worcestershire in 1920, and later beside the River Glen in Lincolnshire. At both sites, populations are small, and vary in size from year to year. It typically grows in shallow, nutrient-rich water at the edge of bodies of water and fenland drains. It is an annual plant, or a short-lived perennial, and the seeds may remain viable for some years, sometimes germinating after the ground has been disturbed.
