= Holly fern =

Holly fern or hollyfern is a common name for several different species and genera of ferns:

Species

- Cyrtomium falcatum in the genus Cyrtomium
- Polystichum lonchitis in the genus Polystichum

Genera

- Arachniodes
- Polystichum
