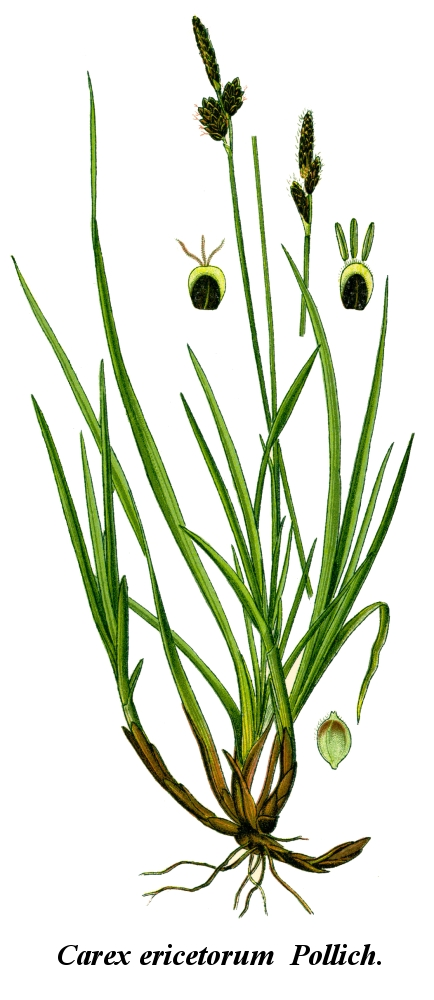

Scientific classification
- Kingdom: Plantae
- Clade: Tracheophytes
- Clade: Angiosperms
- Clade: Monocots
- Clade: Commelinids
- Order: Poales
- Family: Cyperaceae
- Genus: Carex
- Species: C. ericetorum

Binomial name
- Carex ericetorum Poll.

= Carex ericetorum =

Species of grass-like plant

Carex ericetorum, known as rare spring sedge, is a perennial species of plants in the sedge family Cyperaceae native to central Europe and western Asia growing on calcareous soils in short grassland.
