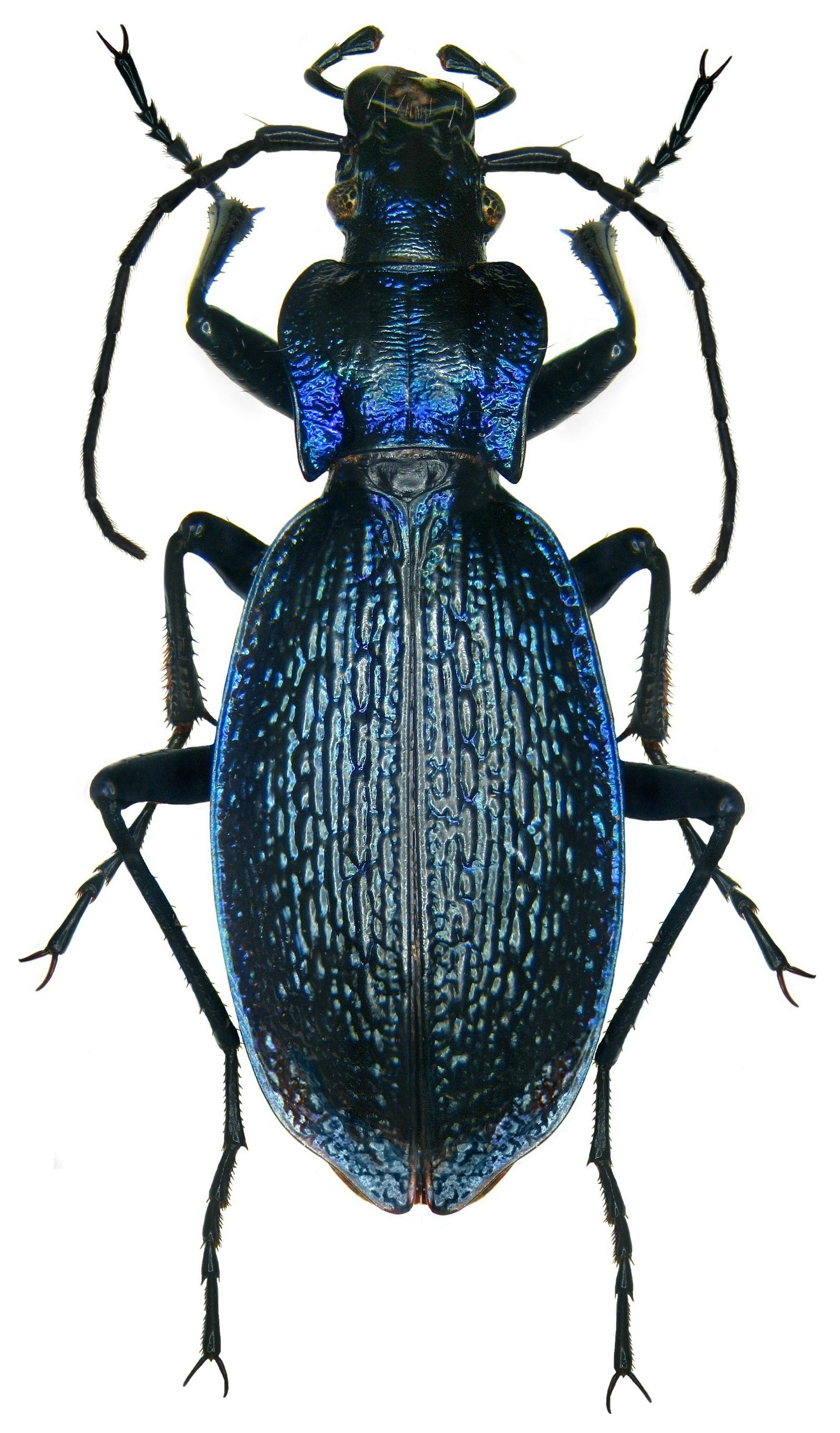

Conservation status
- Near Threatened (IUCN 2.3)

Scientific classification
- Kingdom: Animalia
- Phylum: Arthropoda
- Class: Insecta
- Order: Coleoptera
- Suborder: Adephaga
- Family: Carabidae
- Genus: Carabus
- Species: C. intricatus

Binomial name
- Carabus intricatus Linnaeus, 1761

= Carabus intricatus =

Species of beetle

Carabus intricatus, the blue ground beetle, is a species of ground beetle found in Europe.

It is a large beetle (24–35 millimetres or 0.9–1.4 inches in length), with a metallic purple or blue and roughly surfaced elytra; the second pair of wings (which are used by beetles for flying) under the elytra are reduced. In Britain it was only recorded three times in the twenty years up to 1993 and was considered extinct there. But in 1994 it was found in a couple of places near Dartmoor.

Carabus intricatus are nocturnal carnivores that are mainly active in the spring and early summer. Tests have shown they prefer slugs from the genus Limax, especially Limax marginatus. They were also found to have a taste for liver, dog food, and crabsticks. In the wild, the adults are found under bark on dead wood, and under rocks. It does not require ground vegetation, and likes damp, rotten, moss-covered wood.

The beetles seem to be active throughout the year and a fully-grown larva has been found in summer. This specimen also ate slugs prior to pupating, and emerged as an adult some three weeks later. It is thought that it may take two years to complete its life cycle. The adults are very long-lived.
