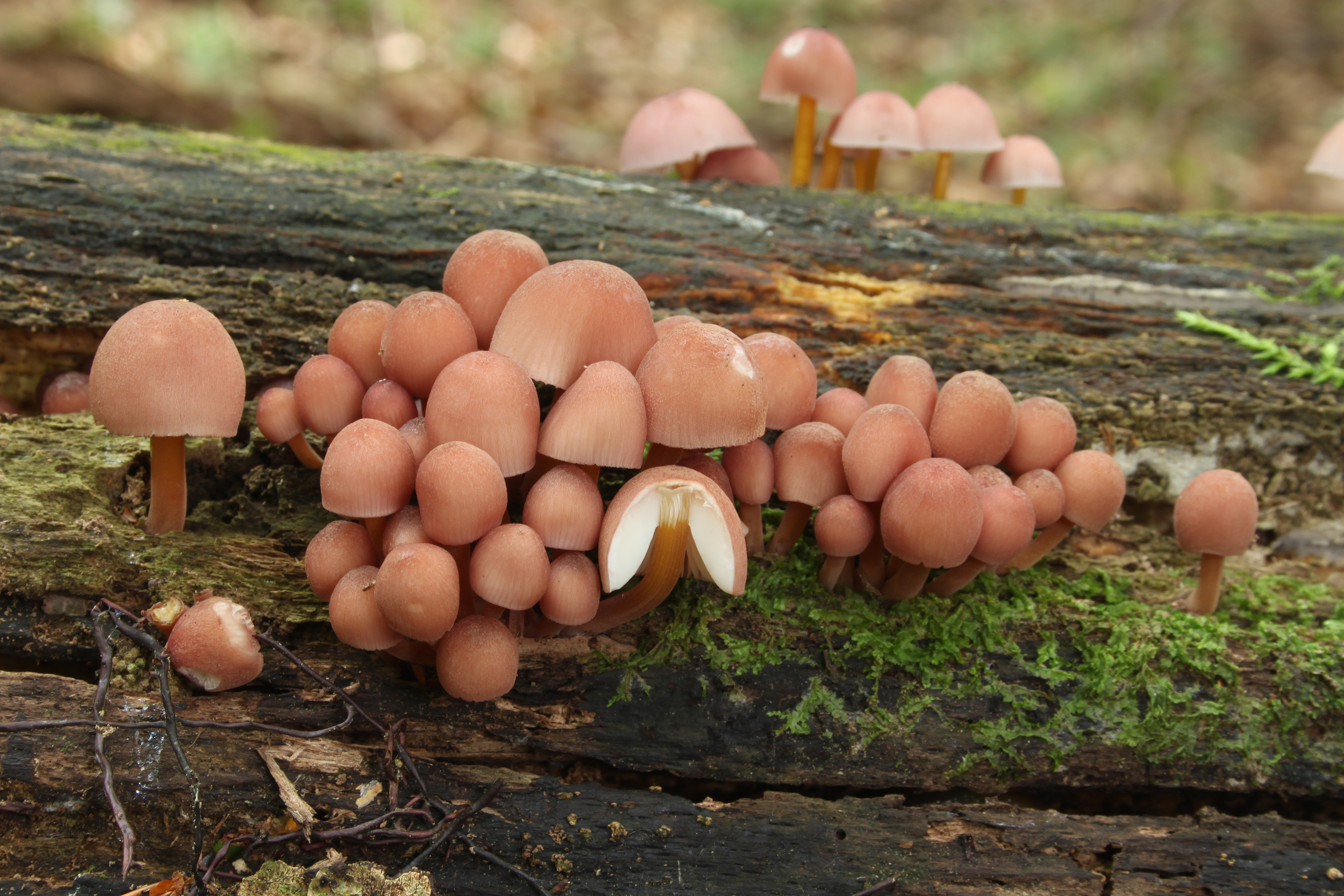

Scientific classification
- Domain: Eukaryota
- Kingdom: Fungi
- Division: Basidiomycota
- Class: Agaricomycetes
- Order: Agaricales
- Family: Mycenaceae
- Genus: Mycena
- Species: M. renati

Binomial name
- Mycena renati Quél. (1886)

Synonyms
- Mycena flavipes Quél. (1873)

= Mycena renati =

Species of fungus

Mycena renati Mycological characteristics
- Gills on hymenium
- Cap is conical
- Hymenium is adnate
- Stipe is bare
- Spore print is white
- Ecology is saprotrophic
- Edibility is unknown

Mycena renati, commonly known as the beautiful bonnet, is a species of mushroom in the family Mycenaceae. It was described by French mycologist Lucien Quélet in 1886. It has been collected in Austria, Uşak Province in Western Turkey, and Yugoslavia.

== Description ==
The cap is initially conic or parabolic, but expands somewhat in maturity to become convex, and typically reaches dimensions of up to 3.2 cm (1.3 in).
