= Rampion bellflower =

Rampion bellflower is a common name for multiple plants and may refer to:

- Campanula rapunculoides
- Campanula rapunculus
