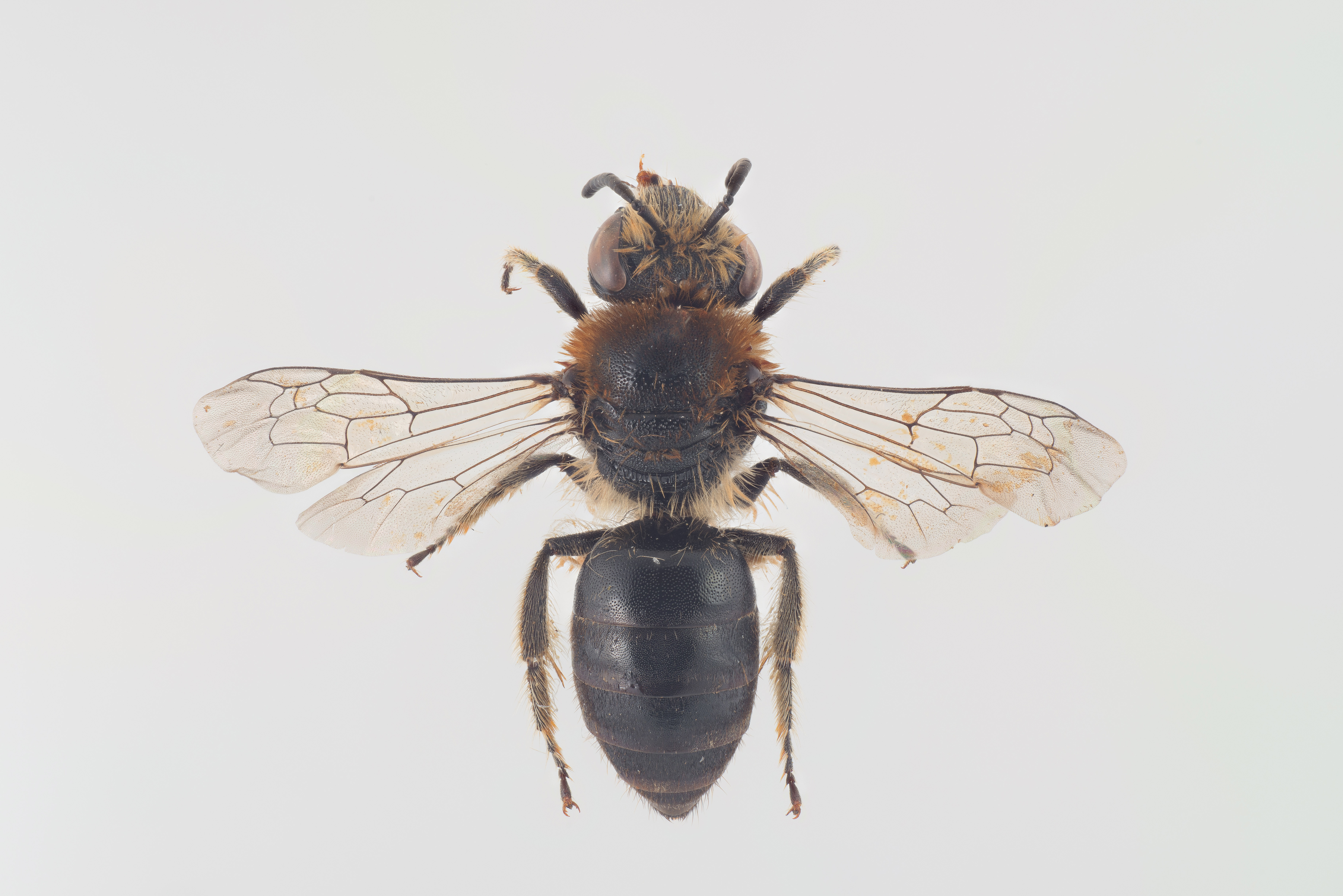

Scientific classification
- Domain: Eukaryota
- Kingdom: Animalia
- Phylum: Arthropoda
- Class: Insecta
- Order: Hymenoptera
- Family: Colletidae
- Genus: Colletes
- Species: C. floralis

Binomial name
- Colletes floralis Eversmann, 1852

= Northern colletes =

Species of bee

The northern colletes (Colletes floralis) is a species of bee the family Colletidae. Northern colletes are solitary bees, though females may nest in what are termed aggregations – sites where the bees nest close together, but do not form colonies as social bees do. They nest underground in soft (often sandy) soil, digging burrows up to 20 times their body length. It is often to be found nesting in coastal sand dunes and, on Hebridean islands, machair (coastal grassland).

== Appearance ==
The bees are medium-sized (with a head-to-body length of around 8–15 mm) and slender. They have a black abdomen, with narrow white bands on each segment. Tawny hairs cover the top of the thorax, with somewhat paler hairs on the face. They are very similar to other species within the genus Colletes and, if more than one of these species shares the same habitat, microscopic examination can be necessary to distinguish between them. Females are slightly larger than the males, possessing slightly longer abdomens, which are also darker and glossier.

== Life cycle ==
Adult northern colletes emerge in late June, and are active until late August. The bees are active only when the temperature is warm. The males emerge one or two days before the females. The females probably mate soon after emergence. The males then die, while the female constructs a burrow which may be as much as 26 cm deep. The female produces a secretion from glands in the mouth, forming a cellophane-like coating for the burrow. Each egg is sealed inside an individual cell, with enough regurgitated nectar and pollen to feed the larva throughout the winter. The larva lives underground, pupating in its burrow and emerging the following June as an adult. As northern colletes do not form colonies, there are no worker bees.

== Distribution ==
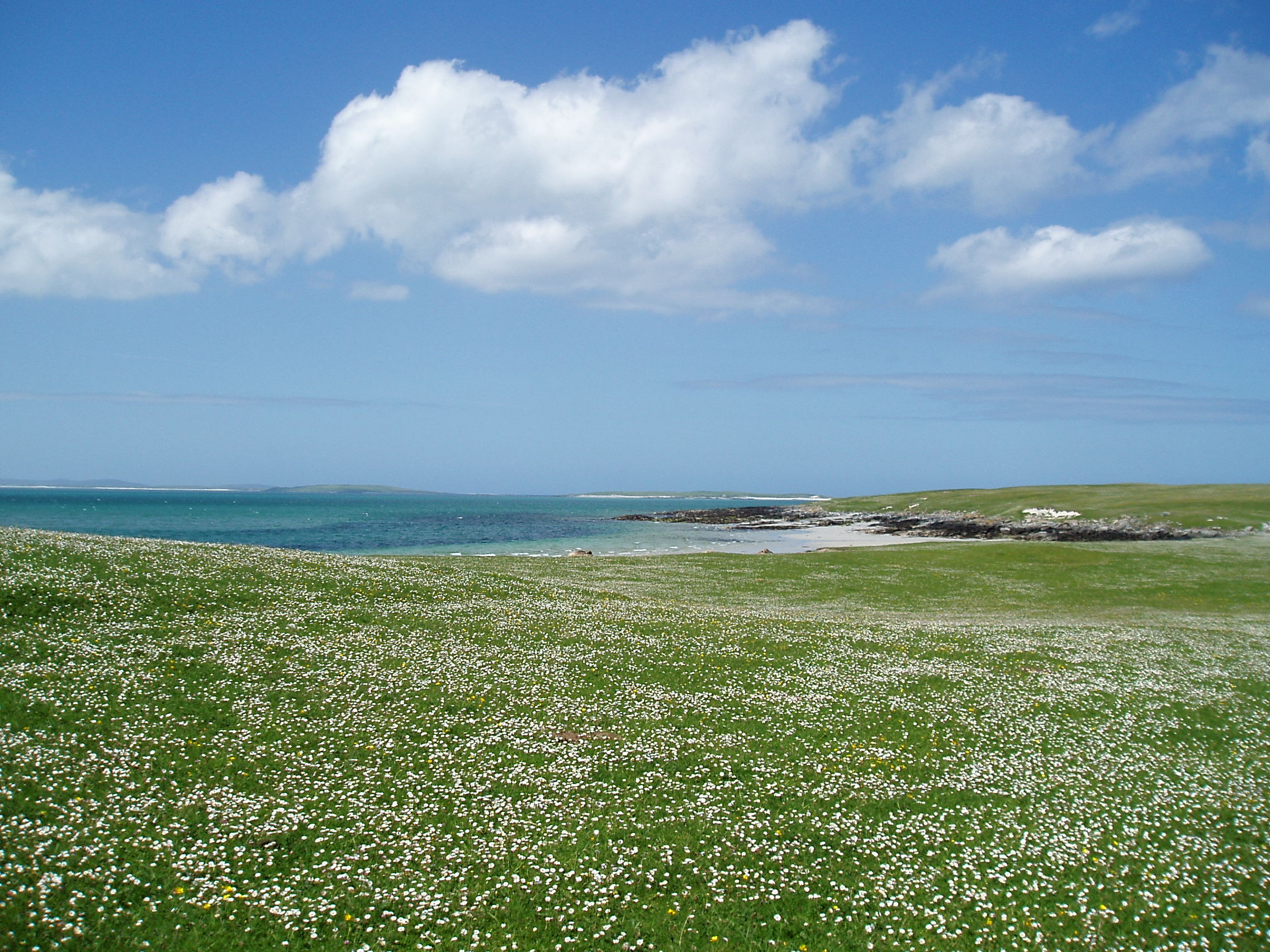
Machair in the Outer Hebrides is a typical habit for this species.

This is a rare bee. It can be found in Britain and Ireland, where it nests on the coasts of Ireland and northern England, while in Scotland it can be found on islands as well as coastal areas of the mainland. Elsewhere in northern Europe, it is present in low densities in Scandinavia, again in coastal areas. It appears to prefer south-facing slopes with low, sparse vegetation; the bee forages in nearby flower-rich areas. In southern Europe, however, it inhabits higher altitudes, being found in the Pyrenees, Carpathians and Altay Mountains.

One of the most significant habitats for this species of bee is the machair (coastal duneland) of the Outer Hebrides in Scotland where it was reported in September, 2007 that eleven previously unknown colonies had been discovered.

== Conservation ==
The bee has been assessed under IUCN regional red list guidelines for the island of Ireland. The species has a threat category of vulnerable in Ireland. The species is a UK Biodiversity Action Plan species and a species action plan was published for Northern Ireland in 2006.

== See also ==
- Colletes
