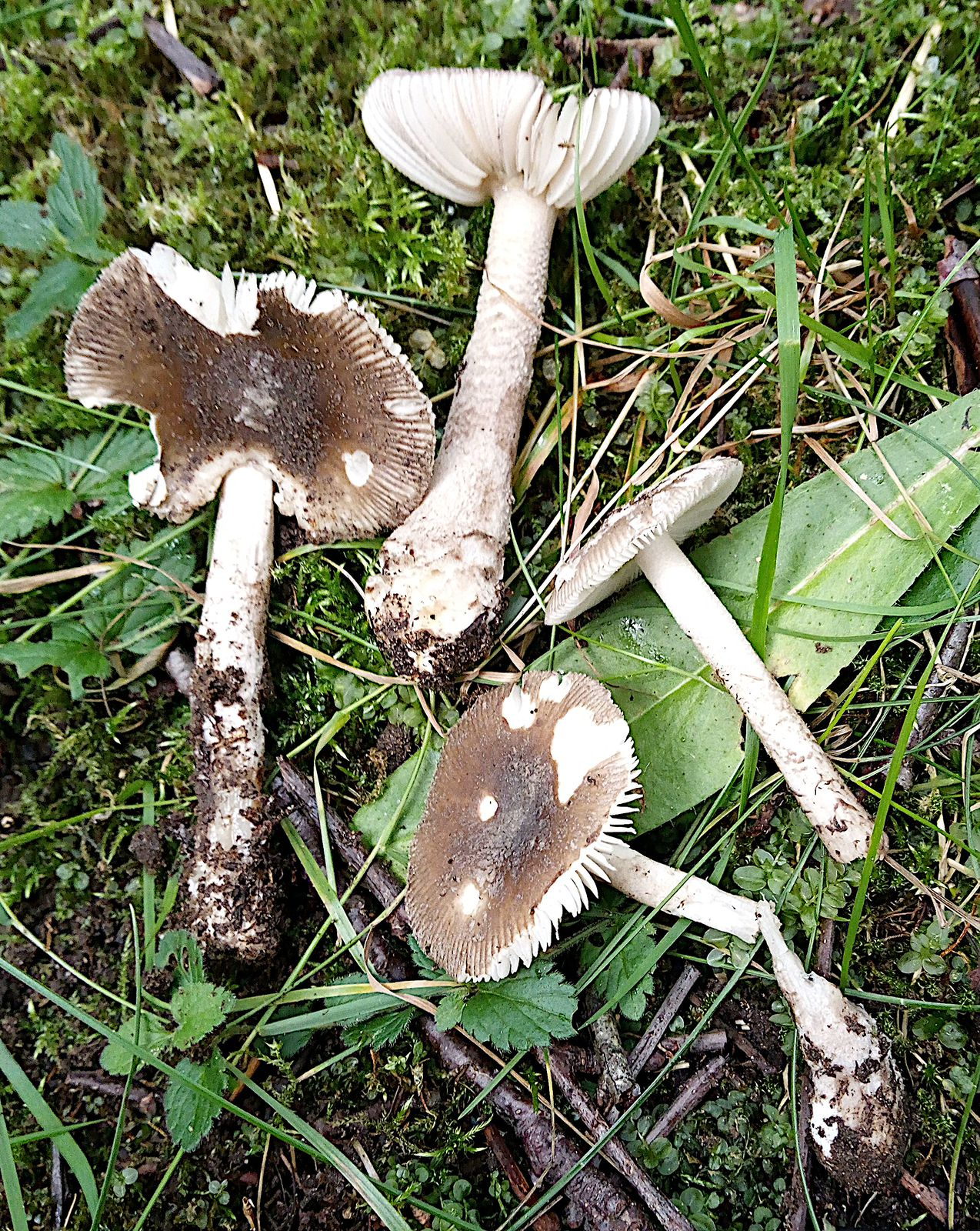

Conservation status
- Near Threatened (IUCN 3.1)

Scientific classification
- Kingdom: Fungi
- Division: Basidiomycota
- Class: Agaricomycetes
- Order: Agaricales
- Family: Amanitaceae
- Genus: Amanita
- Species: A. friabilis

Binomial name
- Amanita friabilis (Karst.) Bas

= Amanita friabilis =

Species of fungus

Amanita friabilis
- Mycological characteristics
- Gills on hymenium
- Cap is depressed
- Hymenium is free
- Stipe has a volva
- Spore print is white
- Ecology is mycorrhizal
- Edibility is edible but not recommended

Amanita friabilis, commonly known as the fragile amanita, is a species of Amanita found across Europe. It grows exclusively among alders (Alnus spp.).
