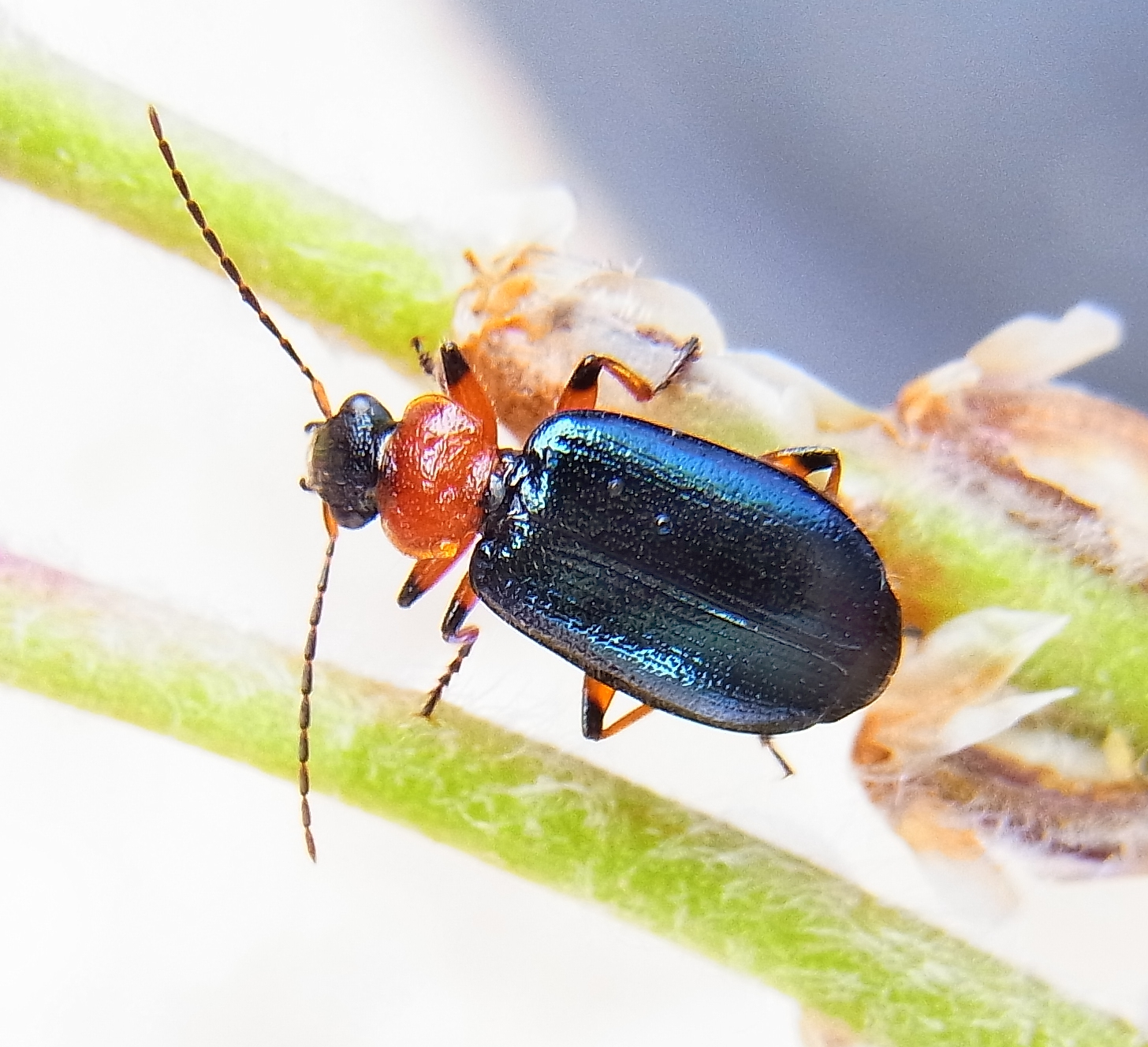

Scientific classification
- Kingdom: Animalia
- Phylum: Arthropoda
- Class: Insecta
- Order: Coleoptera
- Suborder: Adephaga
- Family: Carabidae
- Genus: Lebia
- Species: L. cyanocephala

Binomial name
- Lebia cyanocephala (Linnaeus, 1758)

= Lebia cyanocephala =

Species of beetle

Lebia cyanocephala, sometimes called the blue plunderer, is a ground beetle from a subfamily of Harpalinae.

== Description ==
Adult beetles are 7.5 millimetres (0.30 in) long. The head and elytra are metallic blue.The pronotum is orange.

== Distribution ==
Widespread in Europe but rare. The northern boundary of the distribution area goes through southern England, southern Norway, southern Sweden and southern Finland . The southern limit of the range runs through western North Africa and reaches Israel in Asia Minor . Of the Mediterranean islands, the beetle is only known from Sicily and Cyprus . The species occurs across the Palearctic to the east as far as Siberia and northern China.
