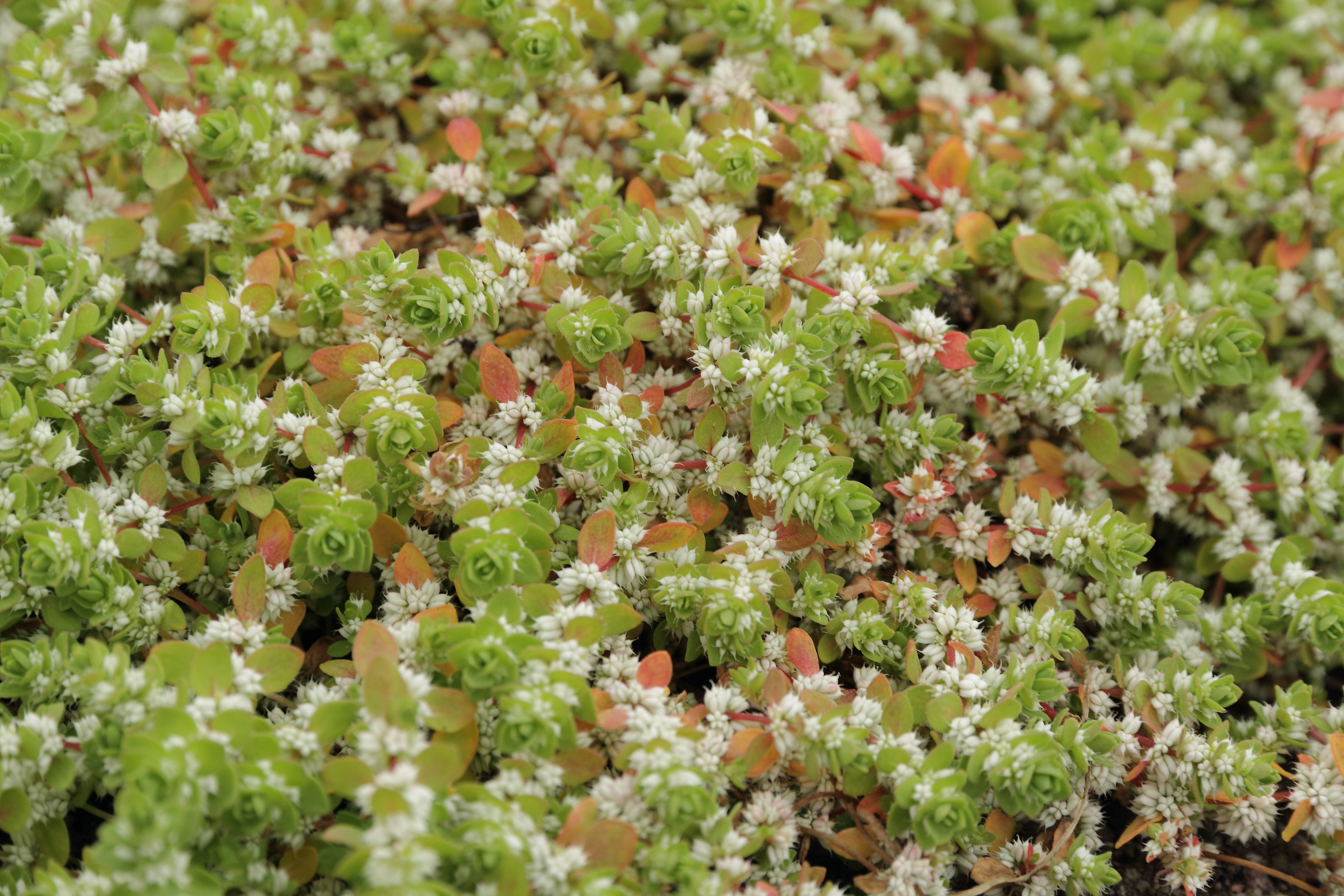

Scientific classification
- Kingdom: Plantae
- Clade: Tracheophytes
- Clade: Angiosperms
- Clade: Eudicots
- Order: Caryophyllales
- Family: Caryophyllaceae
- Genus: Illecebrum; L.
- Species: I. verticillatum

Binomial name
- Illecebrum verticillatum L.

= Illecebrum =

Genus of flowering plants

Illecebrum is a monotypic genus in the family Caryophyllaceae. It contains the single species Illecebrum verticillatum, which is a trailing annual plant native to Europe, with whorls of small white flowers borne in the axils of the paired leaves.

== Distribution ==
Illecebrum verticillatum is native to much of Europe, from the western Iberian Peninsula to Poland; it is rare in Great Britain, and its northernmost station is in Denmark. It has also been introduced species to at least one site in New Zealand and one site in Western Australia.

== Description ==
Illecebrum verticillatum produces procumbent or decumbent (trailing) stems that may be up to 20 cm (7.9 in) high. It has ovate leaves arranged in opposite pairs along the stem. The small flowers are clustered in the axils of the leaves; their petals are much smaller than the white sepals.

== Taxonomy ==
Illecebrum verticillatum was first described by Carl Linnaeus in his 1753 Species Plantarum. It has sometimes been placed in a family of its own, Illecebraceae, but is usually placed in the family Caryophyllaceae. The genus name Illecebrum derives from the Latin word illecebra, meaning "enticement", although it is unclear how the name came to be applied to a plant such as I. verticillatum. The specific epithet verticillatum means "whorled", in reference to the arrangement of the flowers. The plant is sometimes referred to in published works as whorled knotweed or coral necklace, although it is unclear if these purported common names are actually used in practice.
