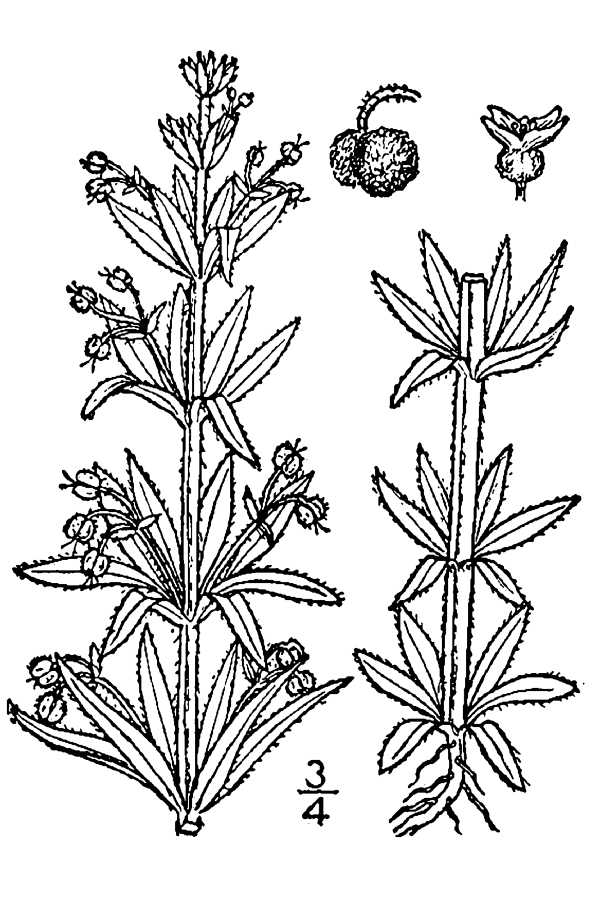

Scientific classification
- Kingdom: Plantae
- Clade: Tracheophytes
- Clade: Angiosperms
- Clade: Eudicots
- Clade: Asterids
- Order: Gentianales
- Family: Rubiaceae
- Genus: Galium
- Species: G. tricornutum

Binomial name
- Galium tricornutum Dandy

Synonyms
- Galium spurium Huds.; Valantia triflora Lam.; Valantia spuria Pers.; Galium tricorne var. microcarpum Gren. & Godr.; Galium tricorne var. laeve Texidor; Horneophyton tetracoccum Philbin; Galium borbonicum Cordem.; Galium kurramensis Nazim.; Galium tricornutum subsp. longipedunculatum Nazim.; Galium tehranicum M.Moussavi, A.Ghahreman & Attar

= Galium tricornutum =

Species of plant

Galium tricornutum is a species of flowering plant in the coffee family known by the common names rough corn bedstraw, roughfruit corn bedstraw, and corn cleavers. It is widespread across most of Europe plus northern Africa and southern Asia, from Norway, Portugal and Morocco to China. It is also naturalized in Australia, the Canary Islands, Mauritius, Madeira, Réunion, Brazil, Argentina, and scattered locales in North America (mostly California and Oregon).

Galium tricornutum is an annual herb with trailing or climbing stems up to about 35 centimeters in length. It forms tangled masses or spreads thin. The stems are sometimes nearly square in cross-section. Leaves are arranged in whorls of 6 to 8 about the stem and are narrow, pointed, and bordered with prickles. Flowers appear in thin clusters of white corollas. The fruits are spherical nutlets hanging in pairs at the leaf axils. This plant is sometimes a weed of grain fields, but it has been driven to the edge of extinction in the UK by drastically changed farming practices over the past 50 years.
