= Amara famelica =

Scientific classification
- Kingdom: Animalia
- Phylum: Arthropoda
- Clade: Pancrustacea
- Class: Insecta
- Order: Coleoptera
- Suborder: Adephaga
- Family: Carabidae
- Genus: Amara
- Species: A. famelica

Binomial name
- Amara famelica Zimmermann, 1832

Species of beetle

Amara famelica (also known as early sunshiner) is a species of ground beetles from a family of Carabidae, genus Amara.
