= Pashford pot beetle =

Scientific classification
- Kingdom: Animalia
- Phylum: Arthropoda
- Clade: Pancrustacea
- Class: Insecta
- Order: Coleoptera
- Suborder: Polyphaga
- Infraorder: Cucujiformia
- Family: Chrysomelidae
- Genus: Cryptocephalus
- Species: †C. exiguus

Binomial name
- †Cryptocephalus exiguus Schneider, 1792

Extinct species of beetle

The Pashford pot beetle, Cryptocephalus exiguus, was a small beetle endemic to the east of England.

The smallest Cryptocephalus species found in Britain, it is primarily black, with yellow legs and yellow bases to the antennae. The male also has a yellow head with a central black line.

During the nineteenth century, the beetle was found in the Norfolk Broads and Lincolnshire Fens, but since 1910 it has been seen only at Pashford Poors Fen in Suffolk. It was last seen in 1986 and may well now be extinct.
