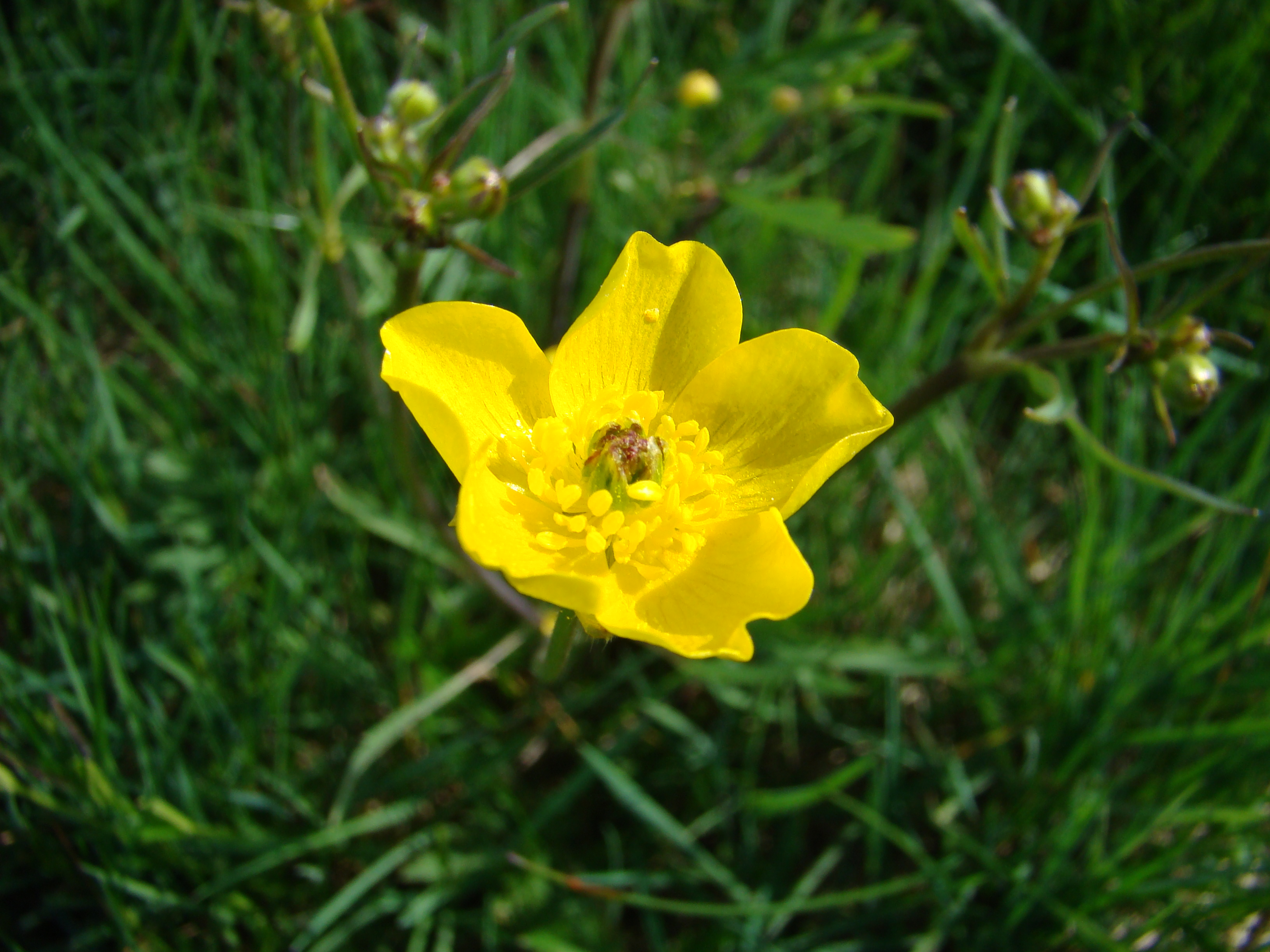

Scientific classification
- Kingdom: Plantae
- Clade: Tracheophytes
- Clade: Angiosperms
- Clade: Eudicots
- Order: Ranunculales
- Family: Ranunculaceae
- Genus: Ranunculus
- Species: R. arvensis

Binomial name
- Ranunculus arvensis L.

= Ranunculus arvensis =

Species of flowering plant

Ranunculus arvensis, the corn buttercup or field buttercup, is a plant species in the family Ranunculaceae. Native to Europe, it can be found on other continents as an introduced species and sometimes a weed, including in North America and Australia. It was formerly a common annual arable weed in Britain, but is now rare there. It is most often found in moist places, such as spring puddles in meadows.

Many local common names refer to the spines on the seed heads or the achenes on the mature fruit:

- devil's claws
- hellweed
- devil-on-both-sides
- devil's coach wheel
- devil's currycombs
- crowclaws (Yorkshire)
- horse-gold (Yorkshire)
- eggs-and-bacon (Cheshire)
- jackweed (Oxfordshire)
