= Leiocolea rutheana =

Scientific classification
- Kingdom: Plantae
- Division: Marchantiophyta
- Class: Jungermanniopsida
- Order: Jungermanniales
- Family: Jungermanniaceae
- Genus: Leiocolea
- Species: L. rutheana

Binomial name
- Leiocolea rutheana (Limpr.) K.Müller

Species of liverwort

Leiocolea rutheana is a species of liverwort belonging to the family Jungermanniaceae.

It is native to Europe and Northern America.
