= List of United Kingdom Biodiversity Action Plan species =

This is a list of United Kingdom Biodiversity Action Plan species. Some suffer because of loss of habitat, but many are in decline following the introduction of foreign species, which out-compete the native species or carry disease.

See also the list of extinct animals of the British Isles.

This list includes the 116 species identified as requiring action plans in the Biodiversity Steering Group's report of December 1995.

== Mammals ==
- Scottish wildcat (Felis silvestris grampia)
- Bottlenose dolphin (Tursiops truncatus), warm and temperate seas worldwide
- European (brown) hare (Lepus europaeus), northern, central, and western Europe and western Asia
- Hazel dormouse (Muscardinus avellanarius), northern Europe and Asia Minor
- European otter (Lutra lutra lutra), Asia, Africa and Europe
- Greater horseshoe bat (Rhinolophus ferrumequinium), Europe, Africa, South Asia and Australia
- Harbour porpoise (Phocoena phocoena), coastal waters in the Northern Hemisphere
- Red squirrel (Sciurus vulgaris leucourus), Eurasia (subspecies endemic to Great Britain)
- Water vole (Arvicola amphibius), Great Britain, northern and central Europe and in parts of Russia
- European (western) hedgehog (Erinaceus europaeus)

== Birds ==
List of UK BAP priority bird species.

- Aquatic warbler (Acrocephalus paludicola), passage migrant through UK
- Capercaillie (Tetrao urogallus)
- Corn crake (Crex crex), globally threatened
- Eurasian wryneck (Jynx torquilla)
- Great bittern (Botarus stellaris)
- Grey partridge (Perdix perdix)
- Red-backed shrike (Lanius collurio)
- Eurasian skylark (Alauda arvensis)
- Slavonian grebe (Podiceps auritus)
- Song thrush (Turdus philomelos)
- Hen harrier (Circus cyaneus)
- Willow tit (Poecile montanus)
- Marsh tit (Poecile palustris)
- Corn bunting (Miliaria calandra)
- Common cuckoo (Cuculus canorus)
- Eurasian golden oriole (Oriolus oriolus)
- Hawfinch (Coccothraustes coccthraustes)
- House sparrow (Passer domesticus)
- Eurasian tree sparrow (Passer montanus)
- European turtle dove (Streptopelia turtur)
- Common starling (Sturnus vulgaris)
- Marsh warbler (Acrocephalus palustris)
- Red-necked phalarope (Phalaropus lobatus)
- Wood warbler (Phylloscopus sibilatrix)
- Roseate tern (Sterna dougallii)
- Common nightingale (Luscinia megarhynchos)
- Lesser spotted woodpecker (Picoides minor)
- Northern lapwing (Vanellus vanellus)
- Cirl bunting (Emberiza cirlus)
- Yellowhammer (Emberiza citrinella)
- Western yellow wagtail (Motacilla flava)
- Black-tailed godwit (Limosa limosa)
- Ruff (Philomachus pugnax)
- European herring gull (Larus argentatus)
- Lesser black-backed gull (Larus fuscus)
- Little tern (Sternula albifrons)

== Reptiles ==
- Slow-worm (Anguis fragilis), Eurasia
- Sand lizard (Lacerta agilis), most of Europe and eastwards to Mongolia
- Northern or European adder (Vipera berus), Western Europe and Asia
- Barred grass snake (Natrix helvetica), England, Wales and mainland Europe
- Smooth snake (Coronella austriaca), northern and central Europe, Middle East

== Amphibians ==
- Great crested newt (Triturus cristatus), Europe and parts of Asia
- Natterjack toad (Bufo calamita), Northern Europe

== Fish ==
- Allis shad (Alosa alosa)
- Pollan (Coregonus autumnalis pollan)
- Twaite shad (Alosa fallax)
- Vendace (Coregonus vandesius)
- Gwyniad (Coregonus pennantii)
- European eel (Anguilla anguilla)
- Brown Trout (Salmo trutta)

== Insects ==
=== Ants ===
- Black-backed meadow ant (Formica pratensis), possibly extinct
- Black bog ant (Formica candida)
- Narrow-headed ant (Formica exsecta)

=== Bees ===
- Shrill carder bee (Bombus sylvarum)
- Wool carder bee

=== Beetles ===
- Beaulieu dung beetle (Aphodius niger), a dung beetle
- Blue ground beetle (Carabus intricatus)
- Bembidion argenteolum, a ground beetle
- Crucifix ground beetle (Panagaeus cruxmajor), a ground beetle
- Hazel pot beetle (Cryptocephalus coryli), a leaf beetle
- Lizard weevil (Cathormiocerus britannicus), probably endemic
- Orbera oculata, a longhorn beetle
- Pashford pot beetle (Cryptocephalus exiguus), a leaf beetle, probably endemic and extinct
- Stag beetle (Lucanus cervus)
- Lough Neagh camphor beetle (Stenus palposus), a rove beetle
- Tachys edmonsi, a ground beetle, endemic
- Violet click beetle (Limoniscus violaceus)
- Tansy beetle (Chrysolina graminis)

=== Butterflies and moths ===
- Black hairstreak (Satyrium pruni)
- Bright wave (Idaea ochrata)
- Brown hairstreak (Thecla betulae)
- Chequered skipper (Carterosephalus palaemon)
- Dingy skipper (Erynnis tages)
- Duke of Burgundy (Hamearis lucina)
- Flounced chestnut (Agrochola helvola)
- Glanville fritillary (Melitaea cinxia)
- Grayling (Hipparchia semele)
- Greenweed flat-body moth (Agonopterix atomella), a micro-moth
- Grey dagger (Acronicta psi)
- Grizzled skipper (Pyrgus malvae)
- Heath fritillary (Mellicta athalia)
- High brown fritillary (Argynnis adippe)
- Knot grass (Acronicta rumicis)
- Large blue (Maculinea arion), endemic subspecies extinct, re-established from Swedish stock
- Large heath (Coenonympha tullia)
- Lulworth skipper (Thymelicus acteon)
- Marsh fritillary (Eurodryas aurinia)
- Netted carpet moth (Eustroma reticulatum)
- Northern brown argus (Aricia artaxerxes)
- Pearl-bordered fritillary (Boloria euphrosyne)
- Reddish buff (Acosmetia caliginosa)
- Silver-spotted skipper (Hesperia comma)
- Silver-studded blue (Plebejus argus)
- Small blue (Cupido minimus)
- Small heath (Coenonympha pamphilus)
- Small mountain ringlet (Erebia epiphron)
- Small pearl-bordered fritillary (Boloria selene)
- Small tortoiseshell (Aglais urticaria)
- Speckled footman (Coscinia cribraria)
- Wall (Lasiommata megera)
- White admiral (Limenitis camilla)
- White-letter hairstreak (Satyrium w-album)
- Wood white (Leptidea sinapis)
- V-Moth (Macaria wauaria)

=== Crickets ===
- European mole cricket (Gryllotalpa gryllotalpa)

=== Damselflies ===
- Southern damselfly (Coenagrion mercuriale)

=== Flies ===
- Golden hoverfly (Callicera spinolae)
- Broken-banded wasp-hoverfly (Chrysotoxum octomaculatum)
- Hornet robberfly (Asilus crabroniformis), Southern England and South & West Wales
- Manx robber fly (Machimus cowini),

=== Grasshoppers ===
- Large marsh grasshopper (Stethophyma grossum)

== Crustaceans ==
- White clawed crayfish (Austropotamobius pallipes)

== Molluscs ==
Gastropods

Freshwater snails:

- Glutinous snail (Myxas glutinosa)
- Little whirlpool ram's-horn snail (Anisus vorticulus)
- Shining ram's-horn snail (Segmentina nitida)

Land snails:

- Narrow-mouthed whorl snail (Vertigo angustior)
- Round-mouthed whorl snail (Vertigo genesii)
- Geyer's whorl snail (Vertigo geyeri)
- Desmoulin's whorl snail (Vertigo moulinsiana)
- Sandbowl snail (Catinella arenaria)

Bivalves

- Depressed river mussel (Pseudanodonta complanata)
- Freshwater pearl mussel (Margaritifera margaritifera)
- Fine-lined pea mussel (Pisidium tenuilineatum)

== Other invertebrates ==
Freshwater:

- Medicinal leech (Hirudo medicinalis)

Marine:

- Ivell's sea anemone (Edwardsia ivelli), endemic and probably extinct
- Starlet sea anemone (Nematostella vectensis)

== Plants ==
=== Trees ===
- Common juniper (Juniperus communis)
- Plymouth pear (Pyrus cordata)

=== Flowering plants ===
- Creeping marshwort (Apium repens)
- Early gentian (Gentianella anglica), endemic
- Eyebrights (Euphrasia sp.), endemic
- Fen orchid (Liparis loeselii)
- Floating water-plantain (Luronium natans)
- Holly-leaved naiad (Najas marina)
- Isle of Man cabbage (Coincya monensis), endemic
- Lady's slipper orchid (Cypripedium calceolus)
- Lundy cabbage (Coincya wrightii), endemic
- Mountain scurvy-grass (Cochlearia micacea), probably endemic
- Norwegian mugwort (Artemisia norvegica)
- Ribbon-leaved water plantain (Alisma gramineum)
- Shetland pondweed (Potamogeton rutilus)
- Shore dock (Rumex rupestris)
- Slender naiad (Najas flexilis)
- Star fruit (Damasonium alisma)
- Three-lobed crowfoot (Ranunculus tripartitus)
- Western ramping-fumitory (Fumaria occidentalis), endemic
- Wild cotoneaster (Cotoneaster cambricus), probably endemic
- Yellow marsh saxifrage (Saxifraga hirculus)
- Young's helleborine orchid (Epipactis youngiana), endemic

== Fungi ==
- Devil's bolete (Boletus satanas)
- Sandy stilt puffball (Battarraea phalloides)
- White stalkball (Tulostoma niveum)

== Lichens ==
- Elm's gyalecta (Gyalecta ulmi)
- Orange-fruited elm-lichen (Caloplaca luteoalba)
- Pseudocyphellaria aurata
- Pseudocyphellaria novegica
- Pyrenula hibernica
- River jelly lichen (Collema dishotomum)
- Schismatomma graphidioides
- Starry breck-lichen (Buellia asterella)
  - morchella

== Mosses ==
- Cornish path-moss (Ditrichum cornubicum), endemic
- Derbyshire feather-moss (Thamnobryum angustifolium), endemic
- Glaucous beard-moss (Didymodon glaucus)
- Green shield moss (Buxbaumia viridis)
- Slender green feather-moss (Hamatocaulis vernicosus)
- Weissia multicapsularis

== Liverworts ==
- Atlantic lejeunea (Lejeunea mandonii)
- Marsh earwort (Jamesoniella undulifolia)
- Norfolk flapwort (Lophozia rutheana)
- Petalwort (Petalophyllum ralfsii)
- Western rustwort (Marsupella profunda)

== Stoneworts ==
- Mossy stonewort (Chara muscosa), probably extinct

== See also ==
- List of species and habitats of principal importance in England
- Natural Environment and Rural Communities Act 2006
- List of habitats of principal importance in Wales
