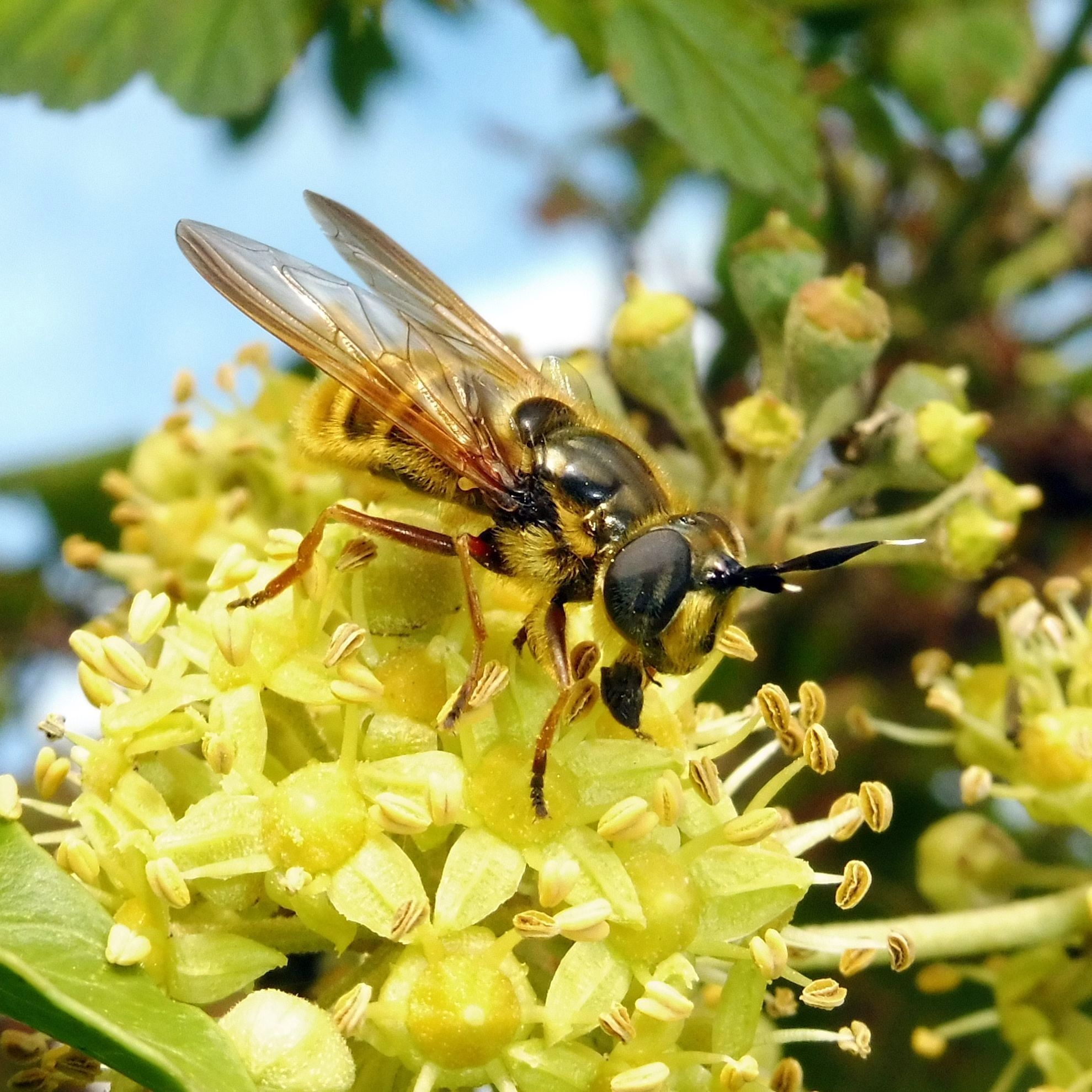

Conservation status
- Vulnerable (IUCN 3.1)

Scientific classification
- Kingdom: Animalia
- Phylum: Arthropoda
- Clade: Pancrustacea
- Class: Insecta
- Order: Diptera
- Family: Syrphidae
- Genus: Callicera
- Species: C. spinolae

Binomial name
- Callicera spinolae Rondani, 1844

= Callicera spinolae =

Species of fly

Callicera spinolae, also known as the ivy hoverfly or golden hoverfly, is a species of syrphid fly within the genus Callicera and family Syrphidae. It was first described by Italian entomologist Camillo Rondani in 1844.

Like most species within the family Syrphidae, C. spinolae are mimics of stinging wasps and bees. This mimicry has evolved in order to fool predators as the species mimicked are associated with an unpleasant taste and nasty sting. This specific kind of mimicry is also known as Batesian mimicry.

It has been placed onto the UK Biodiversity Action Plan list of priority species.

== Description ==
Callicera spinolae have bronze coloured bodies, with an abdomen covered in golden hairs. The golden hairs form stripes down the abdomen, which causes C. spinolae to resemble wasps and bees. They also possess compound eyes and black antennae with white tips.

Callicera spinolae is known to be one of the largest hoverfly species native to the United Kingdom with a wing length of 10–12 mm.

== Lifecycle ==
During the Autumn between September and October, Callicera spinolae will feed and breed. C. spinolae larvae are saproxylic and are dependent on decaying wood for their survival. Eggs are laid inside wet rot holes in trees. Once hatched the larvae feed on microscopic organisms such as bacteria. Larvae will overwinter within the tree and eventually pupate. The larvae of C. spinolae take up to two years to pupate. After pupation is complete the hoverfly is fully mature and will emerge from the safety of the tree.

== Distribution ==
Callicera spinolae is rare throughout western Europe. The species has been recorded in the following locations: Southern France, Germany, Italy, Central Spain, Portugal, Romania, Tajikistan, Greece and Russia.

It can also be found within the United Kingdom, however is confined to eastern England mainly in East Anglia.

== Habitat ==
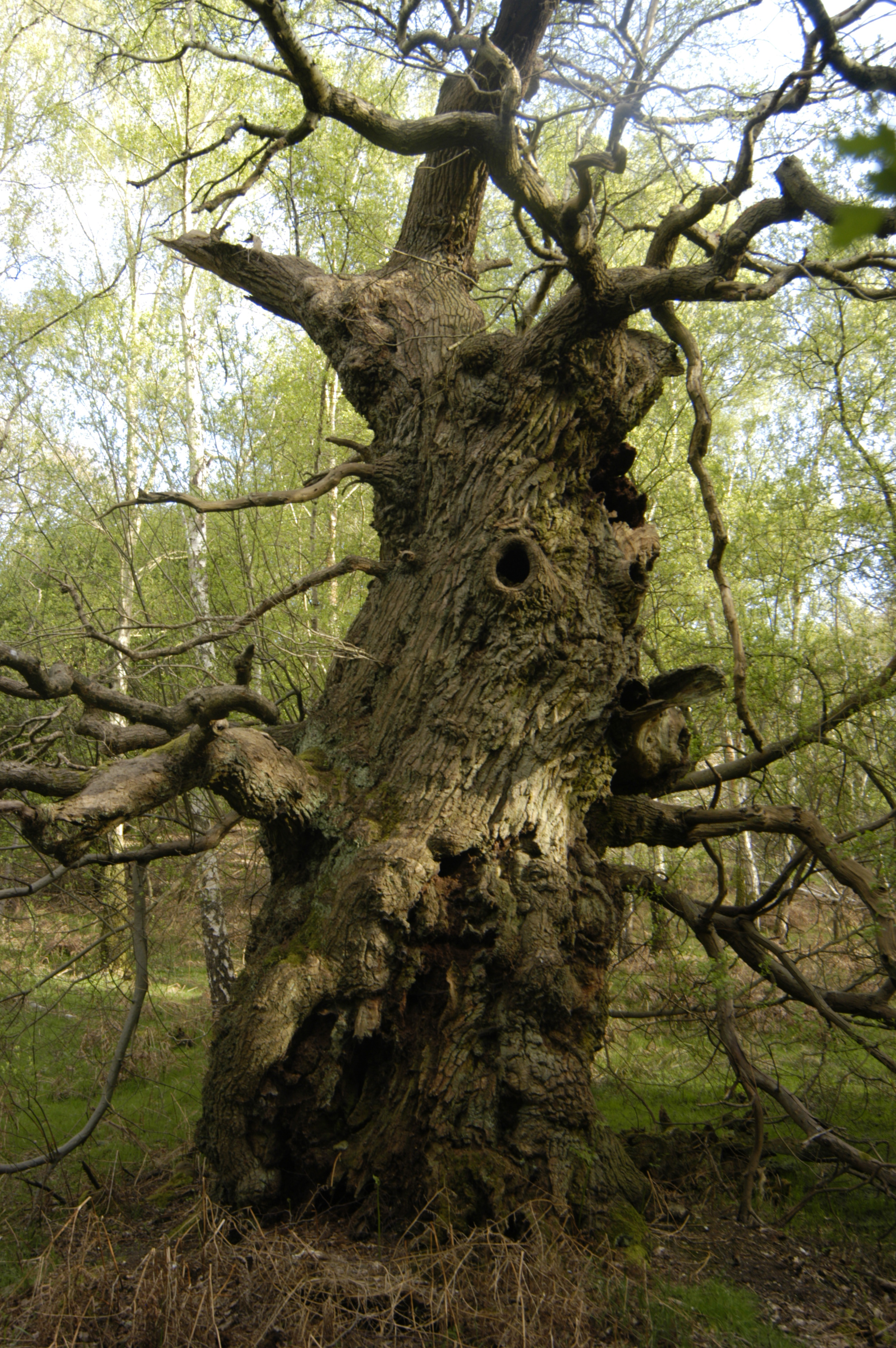
Old trees host rot holes for Callicera spinolae to lay their eggs.

This species can be found within mature or ancient woodlands.

Habitats require a mixture of mature, dead and dying deciduous trees in order to provide suitable rot holes for C. spinolae to lay their eggs.

It will also lay its eggs in trees that have been pollarded by humans. This is because pollarded trees are more likely to contain rot holes.

== Ecology ==
Callicera spinolae can be used as a bioindicator species, which indicates the presence of dead or dying trees within a woodland habitat.

They can often be seen in close proximity to flowering English ivy (Hedera helix) off which it feeds. H. helix is one of the few plant species, which flowers to provides pollen and nectar during the autumn.

Rot holes used by C. spinolae are also used by other animal species, including the closely related hoverfly Callicera aurata. Birds such as Tawny owls (Strix aluco) and bats, such as the Brown Long-eared Bat (Plecotus auritus), also utilise rot holes in ancient woodlands.

Callicera spinolae will use rot holes from a wide variety of deciduous tree species including: Field maple (Acer campestre), Beech (Fagus sylvatic), Horse chestnut (Aesculus hippocastanum), Ash (Fraxinus excelsior) and Black Poplar (Populus nigra).
