= Hall Farm Fen, Hemsby =

UK Site of Special Scientific Interest

Coordinates: 52.693°N 1.669°E

- Site of Special Scientific Interest
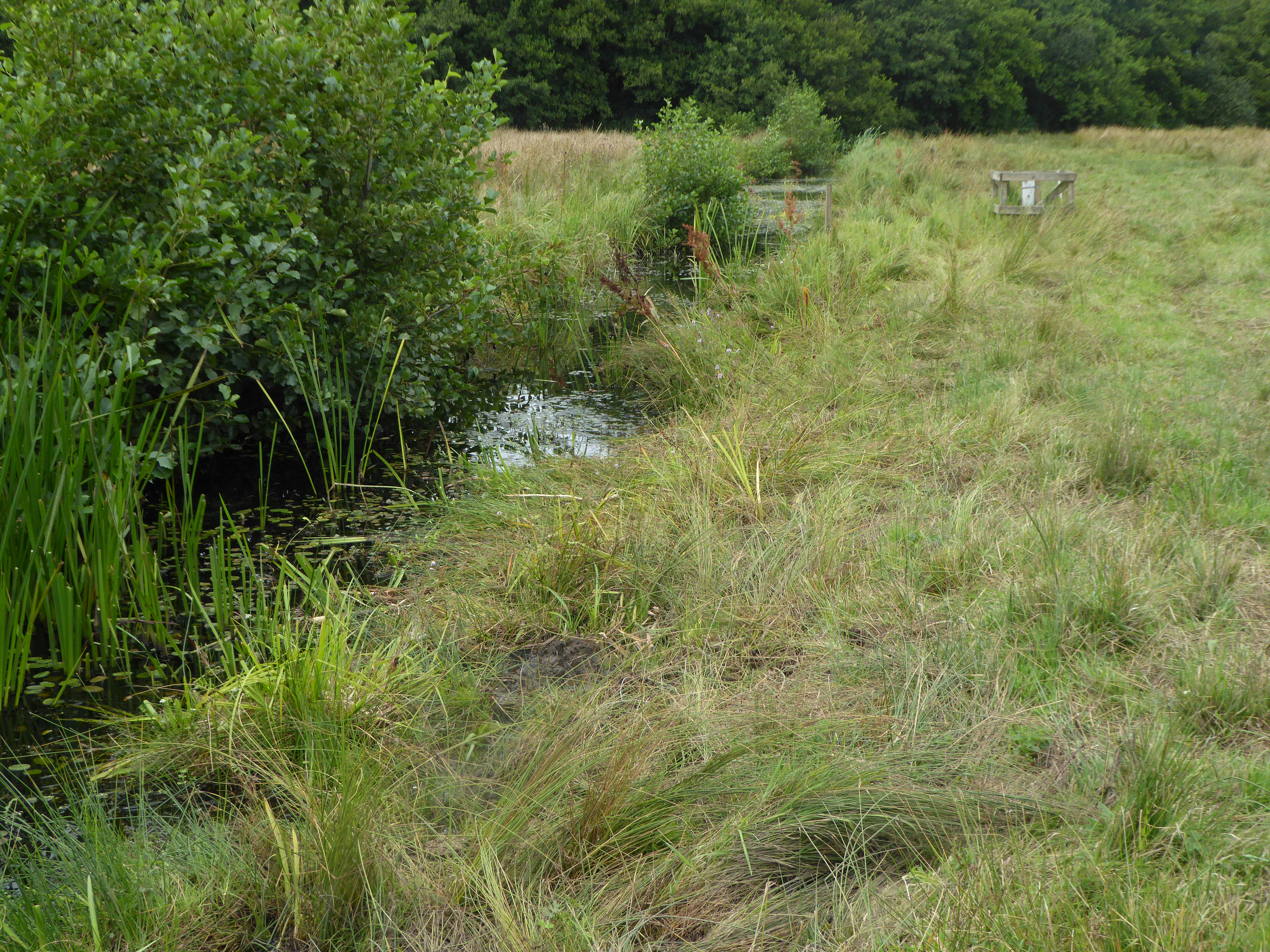
- Location of Hall Farm Fen, Hemsby.
- Area of search: Norfolk
- Grid reference: TG 480 169
- Interest: Biological
- Area: 9.2 hectares (23 acres)
- Notification date: 1986
- Location map: Magic Map

Hall Farm Fen, Hemsby is a 9.2-hectare (23-acre) biological Site of Special Scientific Interest west of Hemsby in Norfolk, England. It is part of the Broadland Ramsar site and Special Protection Area, and The Broads Special Area of Conservation.

This area of unimproved fen grassland and dykes is grazed by horses and cattle. It has diverse flora, including many orchids. The dykes have well-developed aquatic plants and a rich variety of invertebrates, including the nationally rare freshwater snail Segmentina nitida.

There is public access from a footpath through the site.
