= Liothorax rusakovi =

Scientific classification
- Kingdom: Animalia
- Phylum: Arthropoda
- Clade: Pancrustacea
- Class: Insecta
- Order: Coleoptera
- Suborder: Polyphaga
- Infraorder: Scarabaeiformia
- Family: Scarabaeidae
- Genus: Liothorax
- Species: L. rusakovi

Binomial name
- Liothorax rusakovi (Gusakov, 2004)

Synonyms
- Aphodius (Liothorax) rusakovi Gusakov, 2004

Species of beetle

Liothorax rusakovi is a species of beetle of the family Scarabaeidae. It is found in Kazakhstan, southern Russia and Ukraine.

== Description ==
Adults reach a length of about 4.7–5.5 mm (0.19–0.22 in). They are glossy black.
