= Notiocheilosia =

Scientific classification
- Kingdom: Animalia
- Phylum: Arthropoda
- Class: Insecta
- Order: Diptera
- Family: Syrphidae
- Tribe: Callicerini
- Genus: Notiocheilosia; Thompson, 1972

Genus of flies

Notiocheilosia is a genus of hoverflies.

== Species ==
- N. nitescens (Shannon & Aubertin, 1933)
