= Liothorax consociatus =

Scientific classification
- Kingdom: Animalia
- Phylum: Arthropoda
- Clade: Pancrustacea
- Class: Insecta
- Order: Coleoptera
- Suborder: Polyphaga
- Infraorder: Scarabaeiformia
- Family: Scarabaeidae
- Genus: Liothorax
- Species: L. consociatus

Binomial name
- Liothorax consociatus (Horn, 1887)

Synonyms
- Aphodius consociatus Horn, 1887

Species of beetle

Liothorax consociatus is a species of beetle of the family Scarabaeidae. It is found in the United States (California, Oregon).

== Description ==
Adults reach a length of about 4–5 mm (0.16–0.20 in). They have a moderately elongate, convex, shiny, glabrous, black body. The elytra are yellow with the first interstriae and sides piceous, the legs are brownish-red and the antennal club is piceous.
