= Calaminarian grassland =

Type of grassland

Calaminarian grassland is grassland where the process of seral succession has been halted due to the toxicity of soils containing high levels of toxic metal ions. These habitats may be semi-natural on naturally exposed deposits, or the result of mining, or from erosion by rivers, sometimes including washed-out mine workings.

In the United Kingdom calaminarian grassland is regarded as one of its 'habitats of principal importance for biodiversity conservation' and is predominantly found on industrial or post-industrial land, especially in the east of Cumbria and western dales, the Peak District and mid-Wales and parts of the Scottish Highlands. Semi-natural examples are rarer and found mainly in the Highlands and Islands of Scotland. Some examples include Cwmystwyth in West Wales, Halkyn Mountain in Flintshire, Upper Teesdale in County Durham, Oxclose in Tyne and Wear, Caenlochan in eastern Scotland, the Isle of Rhum in western Scotland and Keen of Hamar in Shetland.

Situations where such grasslands occur include near-natural, on serpentine soil and mineral vein outcrops with thin soils; on riverside shingle in areas with high levels of lead and zinc, especially when there has been mining activity upstream; spoil heaps and areas surrounding old mine workings, especially in limestone areas.

Species typical of Calaminarian grasslands include spring sandwort (Minuartia verna), field pennycress (Thlaspi arvense), genetically adapted races of species such as thrift (Armeria maritima) and bladder campion (Silene uniflora). Other notable species include Young's helleborine (Epipactis youngiana), forked spleenwort (Asplenium septentrionale), Cornish path-moss (Ditrichum cornubicum), western rustwort (Marsupella profunda), Cephaloziella nicholsonii, Ditrichum plumbicola, Scottish sandwort (Arenaria norvegica) and Shetland mouse-ear (Cerastium nigrescens).

Grasslands of this type and the rocky outcrops they are associated with provide habitat for several of Britain's rarest plants. These include northern rock-cress (Arabis petraea), forked spleenwort (Asplenium septentrionale) and Young's helleborine (Epipactis youngiana). There are also a number of rare mosses, liverworts and lichens.

== See also ==
- United Kingdom Biodiversity Action Plan
- List of species and habitats of principal importance in England
- List of habitats of principal importance in Wales
