= Liothorax felix =

Scientific classification
- Kingdom: Animalia
- Phylum: Arthropoda
- Clade: Pancrustacea
- Class: Insecta
- Order: Coleoptera
- Suborder: Polyphaga
- Infraorder: Scarabaeiformia
- Family: Scarabaeidae
- Genus: Liothorax
- Species: L. felix

Binomial name
- Liothorax felix (Angus, Maté, Angus & Král, 2024)

Synonyms
- Aphodius (Liothorax) felix Angus, Maté, Angus & Král, 2024

Species of beetle

Liothorax felix is a species of beetle of the family Scarabaeidae. It is found in Italy.

== Description ==
Adults reach a length of about 4.2–5 mm (0.17–0.20 in). They are glossy black, with the tarsi, and tibial spurs dark brown, and the tibiae with a hint of brown-bronze reflections.

== Life history ==
Specimens have been recorded at the edge of a pool below a grassy slope on Campo Felice in the Abruzzo mountains after a day of continuous heavy rain. It is thought that they live at the roots of grass and other herbs.

== Etymology ==
The species name is derived from Latin felix (meaning happy), which is the name of the type locality, Campo Felice.
