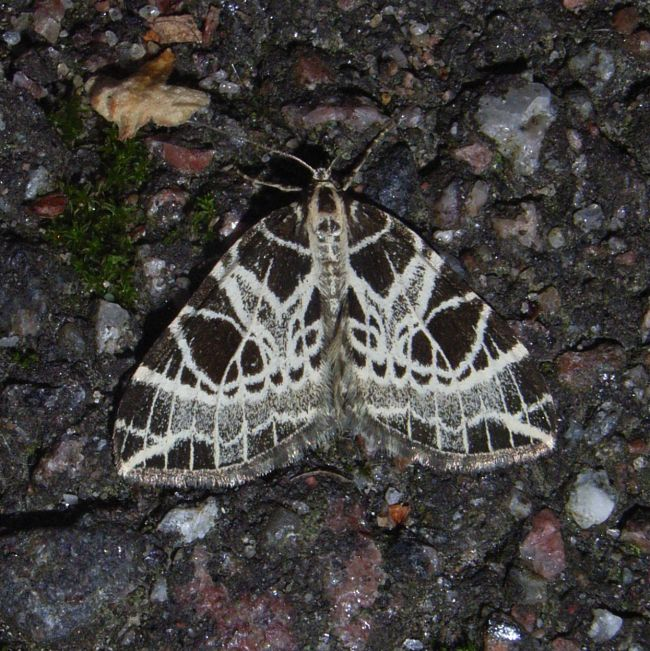
- Eustroma reticulatum

Scientific classification
- Kingdom: Animalia
- Phylum: Arthropoda
- Clade: Pancrustacea
- Class: Insecta
- Order: Lepidoptera
- Family: Geometridae
- Tribe: Cidariini
- Genus: Eustroma; Hübner, [1825]

Synonyms
- Antepirrhoe Warren, 1905; Paralygris Warren, 1900

= Eustroma =

Genus of moths

Eustroma is a genus of moths in the family Geometridae erected by Jacob Hübner in 1825.

== Species ==
Species include:

- Eustroma aerosum (Butler, 1878)
- Eustroma aurantiarium (Moore, 1868)
- Eustroma aurigenum (Butler, 1880)
- Eustroma chalcopterum (Hampson, 1895)
- Eustroma changi (Inoue, 1986)
- Eustroma elistum (Prout, 1940)
- Eustroma hampsoni (Prout, 1958)
- Eustroma inextricatum (Walker, 1866)
- Eustroma japonicum (Inoue, 1986)
- Eustroma mardinatum (Staudinger, 1895)
- Eustroma melancholicum (Butler, 1878)
- Eustroma mixtilineatum (Hampson, 1895)
- Eustroma promachum (Prout, 1940)
- Eustroma reticulatum (Denis & Schiffermüller, 1775)
