= Liothorax muscorum =

Scientific classification
- Kingdom: Animalia
- Phylum: Arthropoda
- Clade: Pancrustacea
- Class: Insecta
- Order: Coleoptera
- Suborder: Polyphaga
- Infraorder: Scarabaeiformia
- Family: Scarabaeidae
- Genus: Liothorax
- Species: L. muscorum

Binomial name
- Liothorax muscorum (Ádám, 1994)

Synonyms
- Aphodius muscorum Ádám, 1994

Species of beetle

Liothorax muscorum is a species of beetle of the family Scarabaeidae. It is found in Hungary.

== Description ==
Adults reach a length of about 4.2–5.2 mm (0.17–0.20 in). They are black and the head, pronotum and scutellum are glossy (although the pronotum sometimes less so). The interstices of the elytra are distinctly reticulate, giving a silky lead-grey sheen.
