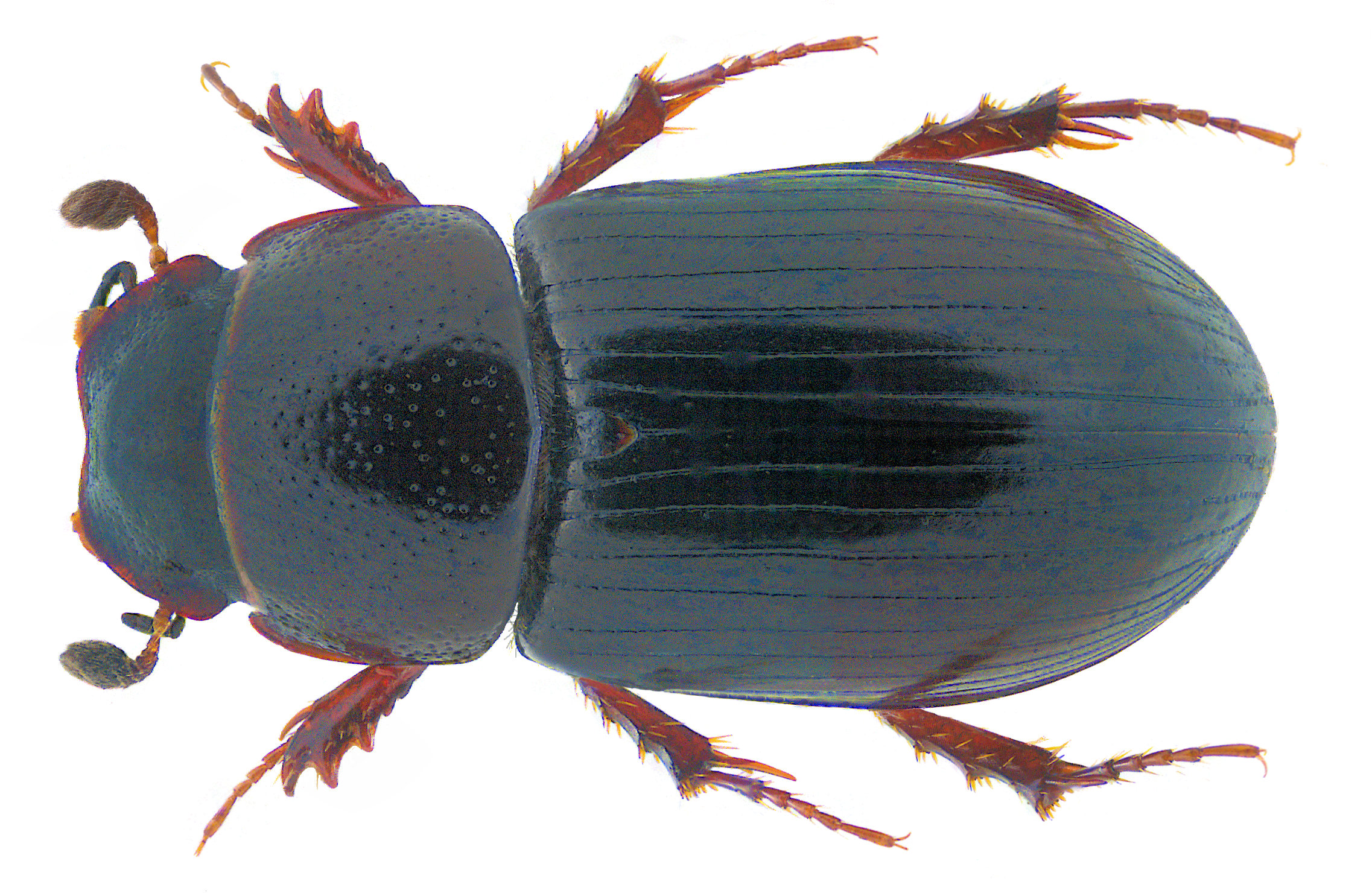
- Liothorax plagiatus, Germany

Scientific classification
- Kingdom: Animalia
- Phylum: Arthropoda
- Clade: Pancrustacea
- Class: Insecta
- Order: Coleoptera
- Suborder: Polyphaga
- Infraorder: Scarabaeiformia
- Family: Scarabaeidae
- Subfamily: Aphodiinae
- Tribe: Aphodiini
- Genus: Liothorax; Motschulsky, 1859

Synonyms
- Aphodius (Ataeniomorphus) Balthasar, 1952

= Liothorax =

Genus of insects

Liothorax is a genus of beetles belonging to the subfamily Aphodiinae.

The species of this genus are found in Europe, Asia, North America, and Central America.

== Species ==
These species belong to the genus Liothorax. Several of these species have been transferred from the genus Aphodius.

- Liothorax alberti (Angus, Maté, Angus & Král, 2024)
- Liothorax alternatus (Horn, 1870)
- Liothorax bameuli (Angus, Maté, Angus & Král, 2024)
- Liothorax bellumgerens (Angus, Maté, Angus & Král, 2024)
- Liothorax chellala (Angus, Maté, Angus & Král, 2024)
- Liothorax consociatus (Horn, 1887)
- Liothorax discoides (Schmidt, 1917)
- Liothorax felix (Angus, Maté, Angus & Král, 2024)
- Liothorax innexus (Say, 1835)
- Liothorax isikdagensis (Balthasar, 1952)
- Liothorax kraatzi (Harold, 1868)
- Liothorax krelli (Angus, Maté, Angus & Král, 2024)
- Liothorax levatus (Schmidt, 1907)
- Liothorax muscorum Ádám, 1994
- Liothorax niger (Illiger, 1798)
- Liothorax plagiatus (Linnaeus, 1767)
- Liothorax rodrigoi (Angus, Maté, Angus & Král, 2024)
- Liothorax rusakovi (Gusakov, 2004)
- Liothorax rutilipennis (Baudi di Selve, 1870)
- Liothorax subaeneus (LeConte, 1857)
- Liothorax wilsonae (Maté & Angus, 2005)
