= Liothorax rutilipennis =

Scientific classification
- Kingdom: Animalia
- Phylum: Arthropoda
- Clade: Pancrustacea
- Class: Insecta
- Order: Coleoptera
- Suborder: Polyphaga
- Infraorder: Scarabaeiformia
- Family: Scarabaeidae
- Genus: Liothorax
- Species: L. rutilipennis

Binomial name
- Liothorax rutilipennis (Baudi di Selve, 1870)

Synonyms
- Aphodius plagiatus rutilipennis Baudi di Selve, 1870; Aphodius plagiatus var. rutilipennis Baudi di Selve, 1870; Aphodius rutilipennis Baudi di Selve, 1870; Aphodius (Ataeniomorphus) cypricola Balthasar, 1971; Aphodius (Ataeniomorphus) ressli Petrovitz, 1962

Species of beetle

Liothorax rutilipennis is a species of beetle of the family Scarabaeidae. It is found in Albania, Cyprus, Greece, Macedonia and Turkey.

== Description ==
Adults reach a length of about 3.1–4.2 mm (0.12–0.17 in). The head is black, with the anterolateral margins of the clypeus and genae with a vague dull yellowish-brown strip. The antennae and maxillary palpi are dull yellowish-brown and the antennal clubs and apical segments of the palpi are darker. The scutellum is glossy reddish brown and the elytra are maroon-bronze or black, the interstices with a silky sheen.

== Life history ==
Specimens have been collected in lowland coastal areas.
