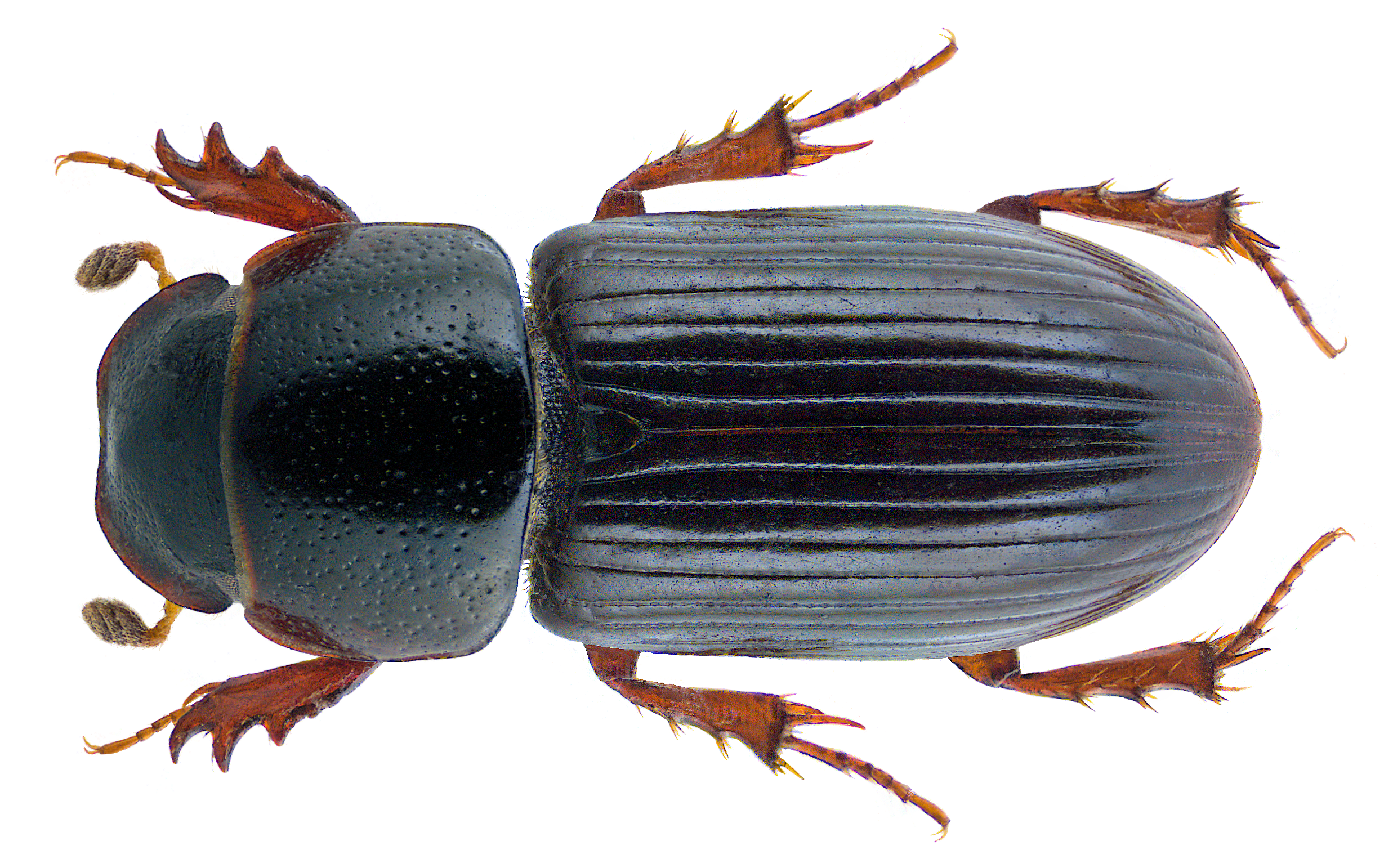

Scientific classification
- Kingdom: Animalia
- Phylum: Arthropoda
- Clade: Pancrustacea
- Class: Insecta
- Order: Coleoptera
- Suborder: Polyphaga
- Infraorder: Scarabaeiformia
- Family: Scarabaeidae
- Genus: Liothorax
- Species: L. kraatzi

Binomial name
- Liothorax kraatzi (Harold, 1868)

Synonyms
- Aphodius kraatzi Harold, 1868; Aphodius graecus Motschulsky in Harold, 1871; Aphodius (Nialus) kraatzi Reitter, 1892; Aphodius (Nialus) kraatzi ab. castanopterus Endrödi, 1955; Aphodius (Liothorax) kraatzi Dellacasa, 1983; Nialus haagi Ádám, 1994

= Liothorax kraatzi =

Species of beetle

Liothorax kraatzi is a species of dung beetle with a widespread distribution from Southeastern Europe, Asia Minor, to Caucasus, and Central Asia.

== Description ==
This small shiny, cylindrical beetle has the average length about 4.0 to 5.0 mm. Body elongate, convex, and glabrous. Body black in color with pale brown antennal club. Legs are reddish brown. Anteriorly gibbose head at middle with fine punctures. Clypeus weakly sinuate with a rounded genae. Pronotum convex, and transverse. Pronotum has dual, irregular, dense punctures. Scutellum consists with sparse punctures. Elytra elongate, parallel-sided with deep striae and distinct punctures.

Adults are saprophagous and stenotopic. They mostly inhabit open habitats, such as damp soil. Beetles are usually abundant during late spring, summer, and autumn. Some specimens have been collected from horse dung.
