= Liothorax rodrigoi =

Scientific classification
- Kingdom: Animalia
- Phylum: Arthropoda
- Clade: Pancrustacea
- Class: Insecta
- Order: Coleoptera
- Suborder: Polyphaga
- Infraorder: Scarabaeiformia
- Family: Scarabaeidae
- Genus: Liothorax
- Species: L. rodrigoi

Binomial name
- Liothorax rodrigoi (Angus, Maté, Angus & Král, 2024)

Synonyms
- Aphodius (Liothorax) rodrigoi Angus, Maté, Angus & Král, 2024

Species of beetle

Liothorax rodrigoi is a species of beetle of the family Scarabaeidae. It is found in Spain.

== Description ==
Adults reach a length of about 3.5–4.23 mm (0.138–0.167 in). They are glossy black throughout except for the clypeal and elytral apical edges which are fuscous red. The legs and maxillary palps are reddish yellow to maroon, and the antennae are tan except for last three segments which are darker and clothed in off-white setae.

== Etymology ==
The name is derived from the surname of the name Joaquín Rodrigo Vidre, a Spanish composer whose most famous work, Concierto de Aranjuez, refers to the geographical area from which the species hails.
