= Liothorax wilsonae =

Scientific classification
- Kingdom: Animalia
- Phylum: Arthropoda
- Clade: Pancrustacea
- Class: Insecta
- Order: Coleoptera
- Suborder: Polyphaga
- Infraorder: Scarabaeiformia
- Family: Scarabaeidae
- Genus: Liothorax
- Species: L. wilsonae

Binomial name
- Liothorax wilsonae (Maté & Angus, 2005)

Synonyms
- Aphodius (Liothorax) wilsonae Maté & Angus, 2005

Species of beetle

Liothorax wilsonae is a species of beetle of the family Scarabaeidae. It is found in Portugal and Spain.

== Description ==
Adults reach a length of about 3.3–5 mm (0.13–0.20 in). They are black without obvious paler edges to the head. The antennae, palpi, and legs are black to very dark brown.

== Life history ==
Specimens have been found in the spring and early summer, either in detritus at the edges of water bodies, or at the roots of vegetation where pools have dried out.
