= Liothorax levatus =

Scientific classification
- Kingdom: Animalia
- Phylum: Arthropoda
- Clade: Pancrustacea
- Class: Insecta
- Order: Coleoptera
- Suborder: Polyphaga
- Infraorder: Scarabaeiformia
- Family: Scarabaeidae
- Genus: Liothorax
- Species: L. levatus

Binomial name
- Liothorax levatus (Schmidt, 1907)

Synonyms
- Aphodius levatus Schmidt, 1907; Aphodius nigroclavus Hinton, 1934

Species of beetle

Liothorax levatus is a species of beetle of the family Scarabaeidae. It is found in Mexico (Chiapas, Durango, Jalisco, México, Morelos, Oaxaca, Veracruz).

== Description ==
Adults reach a length of about 5–5.5 mm (0.20–0.22 in). They have an elongate, parallel-sided, weakly shiny, glabrous, piceous black body. The margin of the clypeus, anterior pronotal angles and elytral apex are pale red, the legs are brownish-red and the antennal club is black.

== Life history ==
They are coprophagous.
