= Liothorax chellala =

Scientific classification
- Kingdom: Animalia
- Phylum: Arthropoda
- Clade: Pancrustacea
- Class: Insecta
- Order: Coleoptera
- Suborder: Polyphaga
- Infraorder: Scarabaeiformia
- Family: Scarabaeidae
- Genus: Liothorax
- Species: L. chellala

Binomial name
- Liothorax chellala (Angus, Maté, Angus & Král, 2024)

Synonyms
- Aphodius (Liothorax) chellala Angus, Maté, Angus & Král, 2024

Species of beetle

Liothorax chellala is a species of beetle of the family Scarabaeidae. It is found in Algeria.

== Description ==
Adults reach a length of about 3.6–4.5 mm (0.14–0.18 in). They are black, with the antennae, maxillary palpi and legs dark brown.

== Etymology ==
The species name refers to the type locality, Chellala (Algeria).
