= Liothorax isikdagensis =

Scientific classification
- Kingdom: Animalia
- Phylum: Arthropoda
- Clade: Pancrustacea
- Class: Insecta
- Order: Coleoptera
- Suborder: Polyphaga
- Infraorder: Scarabaeiformia
- Family: Scarabaeidae
- Genus: Liothorax
- Species: L. isikdagensis

Binomial name
- Liothorax isikdagensis (Balthasar, 1952)

Synonyms
- Aphodius (Ataeniomorphus) isikdagensis Balthasar, 1952

Species of beetle

Liothorax isikdagensis is a species of beetle of the family Scarabaeidae. It is found in Turkey.

== Description ==
Adults reach a length of about 4.6–5.8 mm (0.18–0.23 in). The head is black, but browner towards the anterior and lateral margins and the antennae and palpi are medium brown. The elytra are black.
