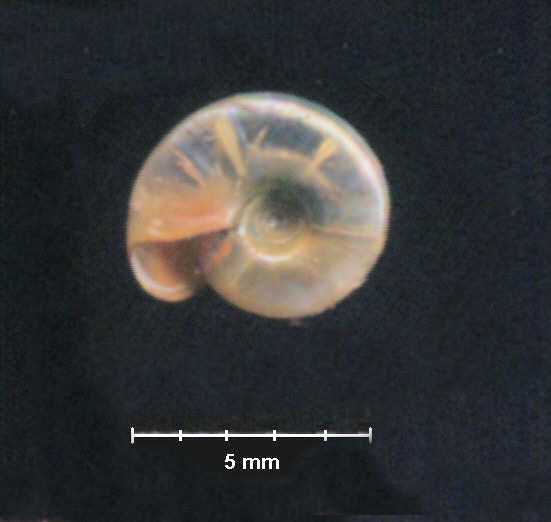
- Apical view of a shell of Segmentina nitida

Scientific classification
- Kingdom: Animalia
- Phylum: Mollusca
- Class: Gastropoda
- Superorder: Hygrophila
- Family: Planorbidae
- Subfamily: Planorbinae
- Tribe: Segmentinini
- Genus: Segmentina; Fleming, 1818

= Segmentina =

Genus of gastropods

Segmentina is a genus of very small, air-breathing, freshwater snails, aquatic gastropod mollusks or micromollusks in the family Planorbidae, the ramshorn snails.

Albrecht et al. (2007) have confirmed the placement of this genus in the tribe Segmentinini within subfamily Planorbinae.

== Species ==
Species in this genus include:

- Segmentina avecenninae Izzatullaev, 1980
- Segmentina bouilleti (Tournouër, 1869)
- Segmentina bugense Gozhik & Prysjazhnjuk, 1978
- Segmentina cantori (Benson, 1850)
- Segmentina caucasica Kruglov & Soldatenko, 1997
- Segmentina chevalieri Germain, 1904
- Segmentina congenera C.R.Boettger, 1915
- Segmentina distinguenda Gredler, 1859
- Segmentina drenici Milošević, 1975
- Segmentina filocincta (Sandberger, 1872)
- Segmentina haueri Stoliczka, 1862
- Segmentina lartetii (Noulet, 1854)
- Segmentina loczyi (Lörenthey, 1906)
- Segmentina malkae Kruglov & Soldatenko, 1997
- Segmentina mica (Westerlund, 1883)
- Segmentina molytes Westerlund, 1885
- Segmentina montgazoniana Servain, 1882
- Segmentina nitida (Müller, 1774)
- Segmentina nitidella (Martens, 1877)
- Segmentina oelandica (Westerlund, 1885)
- Segmentina paparyensis (Baker, 1914)
- Segmentina parva Martinson, 1954
- Segmentina petropolitana Kruglov & Soldatenko, 1997
- Segmentina roskai Gozhik & Prysjazhnjuk, 1978
- Segmentina sandbergeri (Brusina, 1893)
- Segmentina servaini Bourguignat, 1881
- Segmentina starobogatovi Kruglov & Soldatenko, 1997
- Segmentina stenomphalus (Brusina, 1902)
- Segmentina usta Gould, 1859
