= Liothorax alberti =

Scientific classification
- Kingdom: Animalia
- Phylum: Arthropoda
- Clade: Pancrustacea
- Class: Insecta
- Order: Coleoptera
- Suborder: Polyphaga
- Infraorder: Scarabaeiformia
- Family: Scarabaeidae
- Genus: Liothorax
- Species: L. alberti

Binomial name
- Liothorax alberti (Angus, Maté, Angus & Král, 2024)

Synonyms
- Aphodius (Liothorax) alberti Angus, Maté, Angus & Král, 2024

Species of beetle

Liothorax alberti is a species of beetle of the family Scarabaeidae. It is found in Armenia and Turkey.

== Description ==
Adults reach a length of about 4.1–4.9 mm (0.16–0.19 in). The head is black, with the anterior clypeal margin dark brown, the maxillary palpi glossy blackish-brown and the antennae dark brown. The elytra are black.

== Life history ==
Specimens have been found on snow patches and in puddles at the sides of the road passing through Ovit pass, a typical alpine prairie.
