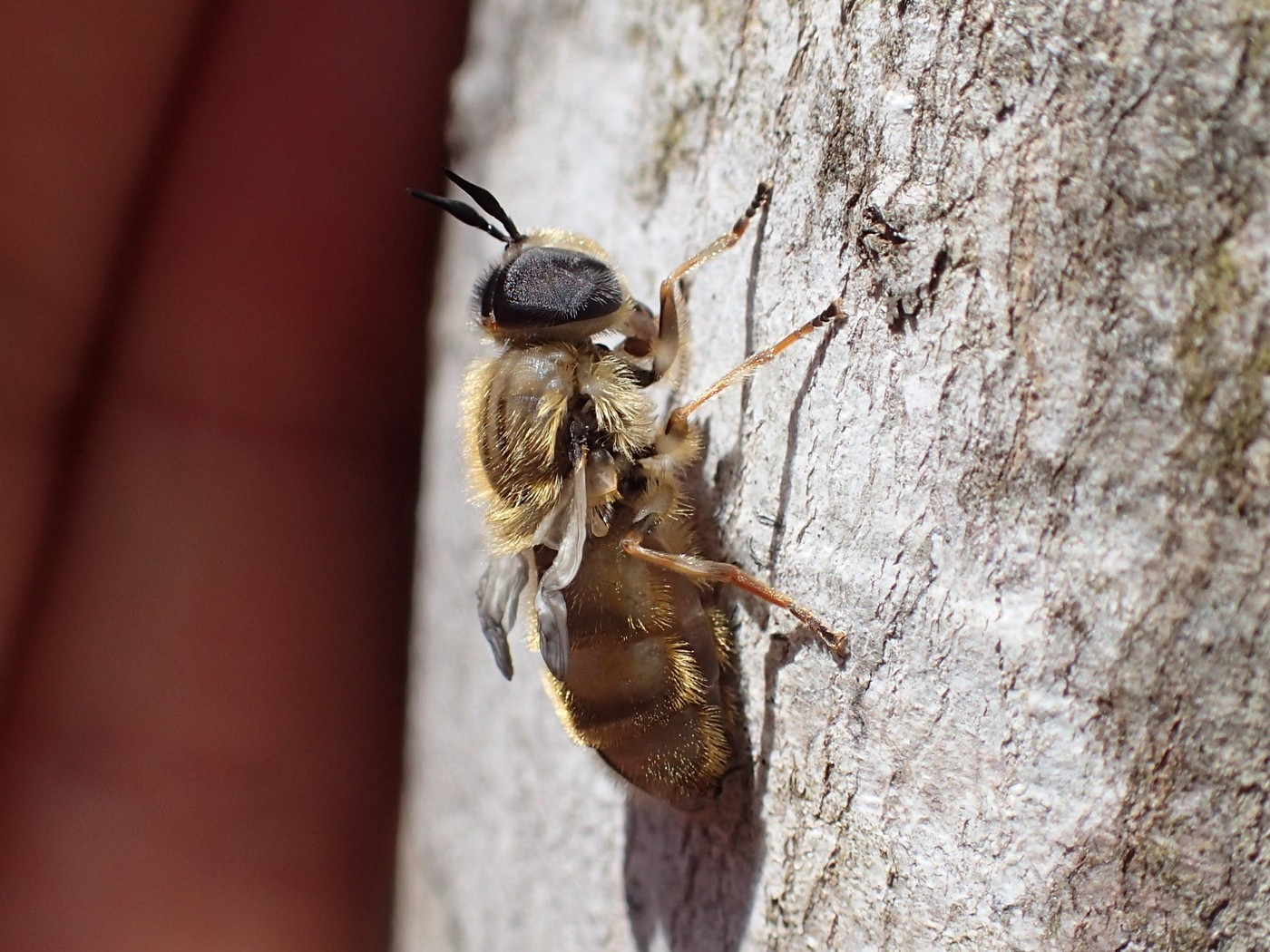
- Callicera erratica just emerging

Scientific classification
- Domain: Eukaryota
- Kingdom: Animalia
- Phylum: Arthropoda
- Class: Insecta
- Order: Diptera
- Family: Syrphidae
- Genus: Callicera
- Species: C. erratica

Binomial name
- Callicera erratica (Walker, 1849)

Synonyms
- Callicera auripila Metcalf, 1916; Callicera johnsoni Hunter, 1896; Chrysotoxum erraticum Walker, 1849

= Callicera erratica =

Species of fly

Callicera erratica , the golden pine fly, is a rare species of syrphid fly observed in the Northeastern United States and Canada. Hoverflies are known for their ability to remain nearly motionless in flight. The adults are also known as flower flies because they are commonly found on flowers, from which they get both energy-giving nectar and protein-rich pollen. The larvae live in water-filled rot-holes and cavities of old, living conifers.
