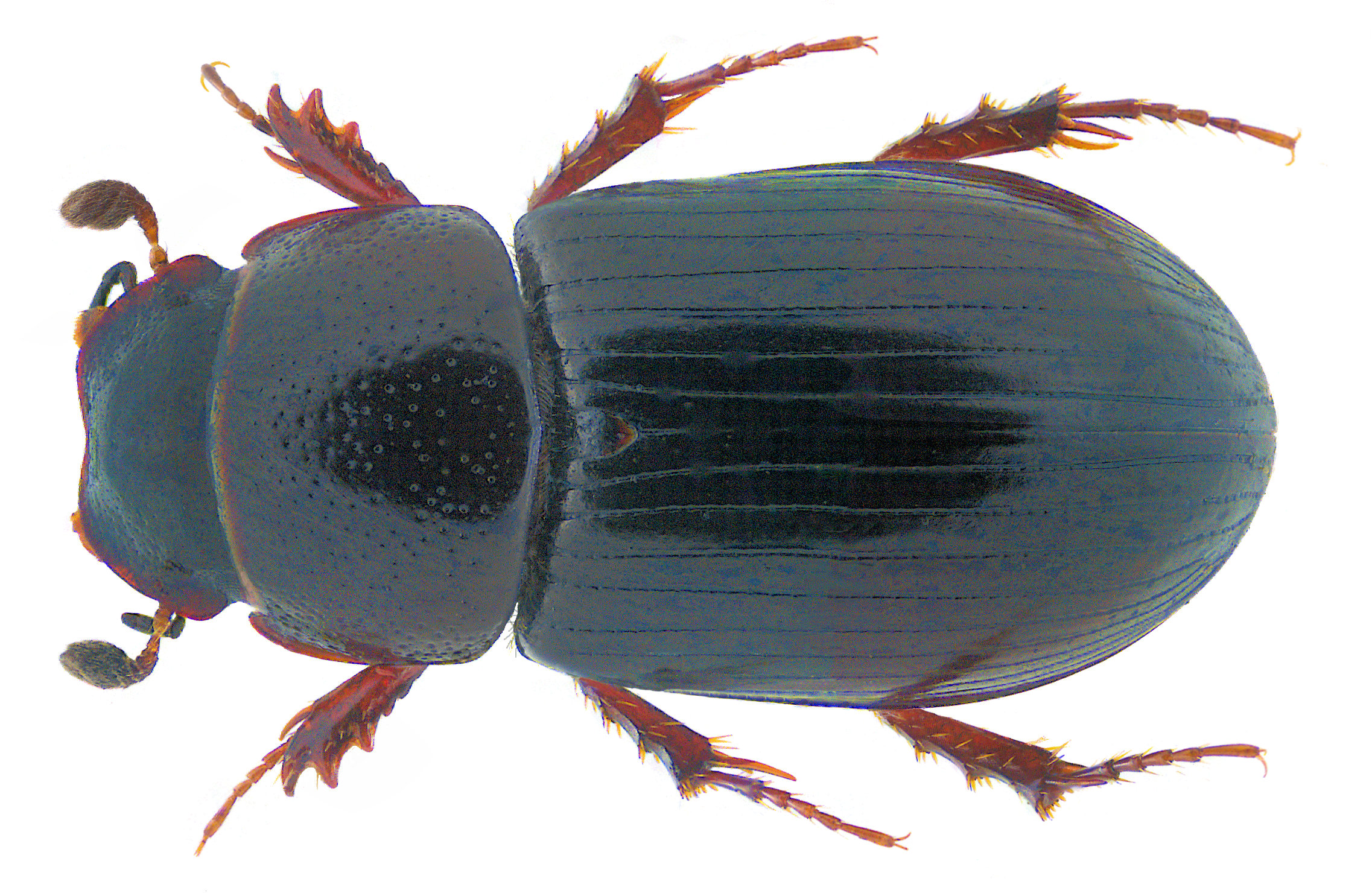

Scientific classification
- Kingdom: Animalia
- Phylum: Arthropoda
- Clade: Pancrustacea
- Class: Insecta
- Order: Coleoptera
- Suborder: Polyphaga
- Infraorder: Scarabaeiformia
- Family: Scarabaeidae
- Genus: Liothorax
- Species: L. plagiatus

Binomial name
- Liothorax plagiatus (Linnaeus, 1767)

Synonyms
- Scarabaeus plagiatus Linnaeus, 1767; Aphodius (Nialus) plagiatus hungaricus Endrödi, 1955; Aphodius plagiatus parvomaculata Schmidt G., 1938; Aphodius plagiatus bivittatus Everts, 1903; Aphodius (Liothorax) plagiatus sinoplagiatus Angus, Maté, Angus & Král, 2024; Aphodius (Nialus) jakutorum Balthasar, 1938; Aphodius plagiatus concolor Schilsky, 1888; Aphodius plagiatus immaculatus Dalla Torre, 1879; Aphodius longulus Ménétriés, 1849

= Liothorax plagiatus =

Genus of beetles

Liothorax plagiatus is a beetle in the subfamily Aphodiinae. It was described by Carl Linnaeus in 1767. It occurs in Europe, the Near East, and North Africa.

== Description ==
Adults reach a length of about 4–4.5 mm (0.16–0.18 in). They have an elongate, subcylindrical, convex, glabrous, shiny, blackish body, sometimes with reddish spots on the elytra.

== Life history ==
It is saprophagous rather than a "true" dung beetle.

== Subspecies ==
- Liothorax plagiatus plagiatus (Afghanistan, Albania, Armenia, Austria, Azerbaijan, Belarus, Belgium, Bosnia and Herzegovina, Bulgaria, China [Beijing, Guizhou, Sichuan, Yunnan], Croatia, the Czech Republic, Denmark, Finland, Estonia, France, Germany, Great Britain, Greece, Hungary, Iran, Iraq, Ireland, Israel, Jordan, Kazakhstan, Kyrgyzstan, Latvia, Lebanon, Lithuania, Macedonia, Malta, Mongolia, the Netherlands, Norway, Poland, Romania, Russia, Slovakia, Spain, Sweden, Switzerland, Syria, Tajikistan, Tunisia, Turkey, Turkmenistan, Ukraine, Uzbekistan)
- Liothorax plagiatus sinoplagiatus (Angus, Maté, Angus & Král, 2024) (China: Gansu, Qinghai)
