= Liothorax innexus =

Scientific classification
- Kingdom: Animalia
- Phylum: Arthropoda
- Clade: Pancrustacea
- Class: Insecta
- Order: Coleoptera
- Suborder: Polyphaga
- Infraorder: Scarabaeiformia
- Family: Scarabaeidae
- Genus: Liothorax
- Species: L. innexus

Binomial name
- Liothorax innexus (Say, 1835)

Synonyms
- Aphodius innexus Say, 1835; Aphodius flavocinctus Harold, 1860

Species of beetle

Liothorax innexus is a species of beetle of the family Scarabaeidae. It is found in Mexico (Aguascalientes, Distrito Federal, Durango, Guanajuato, Guerrero, Hidalgo, Jalisco, México, Michoacán, Oaxaca, Puebla, Tlaxcala, Veracruz) and the Virgin Islands. Records from California are based on misidentifications.

== Description ==
Adults reach a length of about 5–6 mm (0.20–0.24 in). They have a subelongate, parallel, convex, shiny, glabrous, piceous body, with the front angles of the pronotum, humeral angle, sides and apex of the elytra dirty yellow.

== Life history ==
They are coprophagous.
