= Liothorax krelli =

Scientific classification
- Kingdom: Animalia
- Phylum: Arthropoda
- Clade: Pancrustacea
- Class: Insecta
- Order: Coleoptera
- Suborder: Polyphaga
- Infraorder: Scarabaeiformia
- Family: Scarabaeidae
- Genus: Liothorax
- Species: L. krelli

Binomial name
- Liothorax krelli (Angus, Maté, Angus & Král, 2024)

Synonyms
- Aphodius (Liothorax) krelli Angus, Maté, Angus & Král, 2024

Species of beetle

Liothorax krelli is a species of beetle of the family Scarabaeidae. It is found in Italy (Sardinia).

== Description ==
Adults reach a length of about 4.4–5 mm (0.17–0.20 in). They have a glossy black head, with the antennae and palpi blackish-brown. The pronotum and scutellum are glossy black. The ground colour of the interstices of the elytra is silky black with very fine faint isodiametric reticulation. The striae are glossy black.

== Life history ==
Specimens have been found at the edge of water.

== Etymology ==
The species is named in honour of Dr F. T. Krell of the Museum of Nature and Science, Denver, Colorado.
