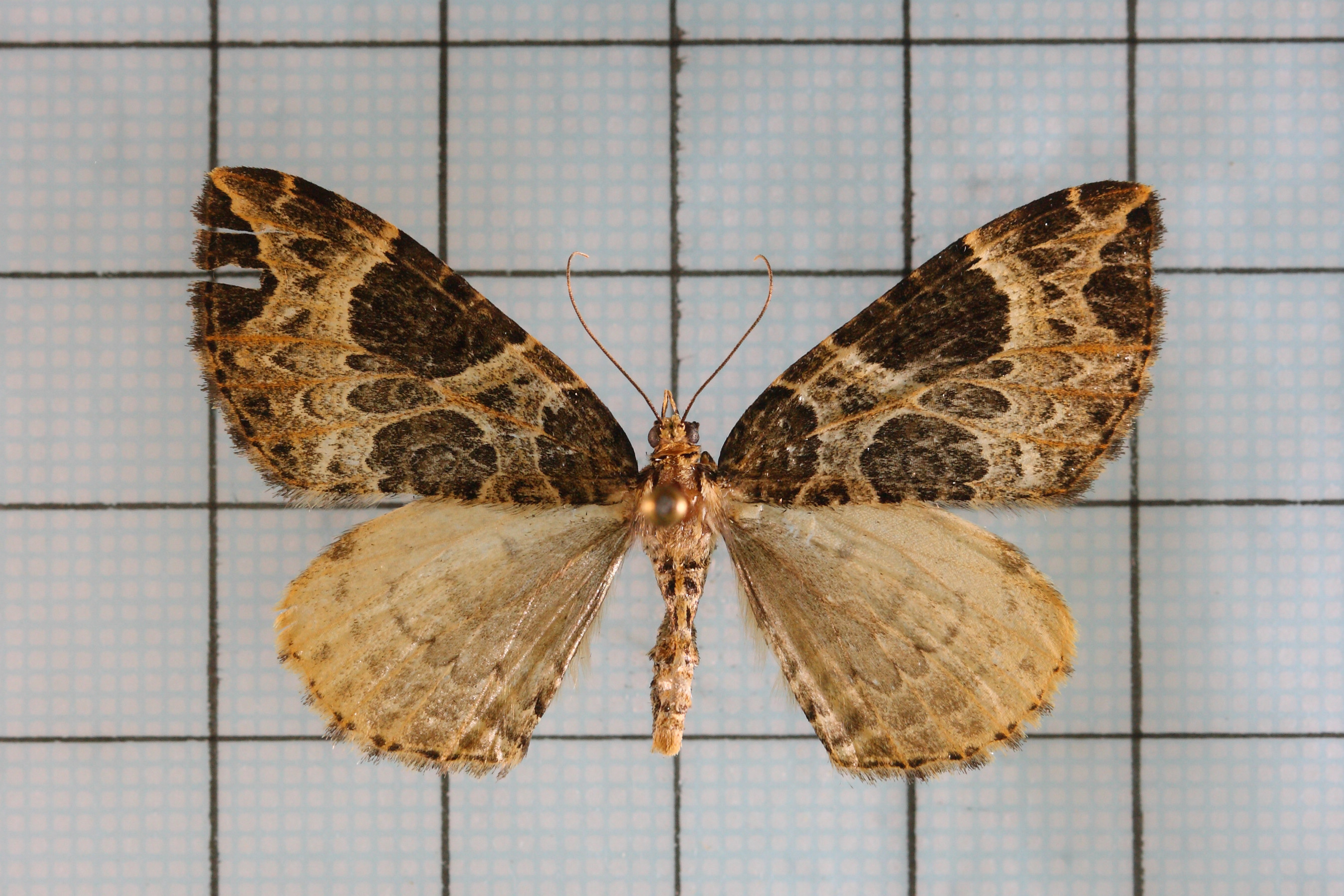
- Eustroma melancholicum interruptum

Scientific classification
- Domain: Eukaryota
- Kingdom: Animalia
- Phylum: Arthropoda
- Class: Insecta
- Order: Lepidoptera
- Family: Geometridae
- Genus: Eustroma
- Species: E. melancholicum

Binomial name
- Eustroma melancholicum (Butler, 1878)

Synonyms
- Cidaria melancholica Butler, 1878; Eustroma brunnearia Leech, 1897; Cidaria interrupta Wileman, 1911; Eustroma pilosa Thierry-Mieg, 1910; Cidaria venulata Oberthur, 1880; Cidaria chlorovenosata Christoph, 1881; Eustroma dureri Bryk, 1949

= Eustroma melancholicum =

Species of moth

Eustroma melancholicum is a moth in the family Geometridae. It was described by Arthur Gardiner Butler in 1878. It is found in Asia, including Taiwan, Japan and the Russian Far East.

The wingspan is 36–43 millimetres (1.4–1.7 in).

== Subspecies ==
- Eustroma melancholicum melancholicum
- Eustroma melancholicum brunnearium Leech, 1897
- Eustroma melancholicum interruptum (Wileman, 1911)
- Eustroma melancholicum venulatum (Oberthür, 1880)
- Eustroma melancholicum venipictum Warren, 1893
