= Liothorax bellumgerens =

Scientific classification
- Kingdom: Animalia
- Phylum: Arthropoda
- Clade: Pancrustacea
- Class: Insecta
- Order: Coleoptera
- Suborder: Polyphaga
- Infraorder: Scarabaeiformia
- Family: Scarabaeidae
- Genus: Liothorax
- Species: L. bellumgerens

Binomial name
- Liothorax bellumgerens (Angus, Maté, Angus & Král, 2024)

Synonyms
- Aphodius (Liothorax) bellumgerens Angus, Maté, Angus & Král, 2024

Species of beetle

Liothorax bellumgerens is a species of beetle of the family Scarabaeidae. It is found in Italy (Sicily).

== Description ==
Adults reach a length of about 3.6–4.8 mm (0.14–0.19 in). They are glossy black, with the apical segments and the claws of the tarsi dark brown.

== Life history ==
Specimens have been taken by swishing the water at the edges of the pool on the Piano Battaglia, washing the beetles from the banks so that they floated on the water. This pool dries out completely in the summer. Monte Soro specimens were floating and clinging to plants in a shallow pool, following recent rain.

== Etymology ==
The species name is derived from Latin bellumgerens (meaning waging war), which is the name of the type locality, Piano Battaglia.
