= Callicera rufa =

Scientific classification
- Domain: Eukaryota
- Kingdom: Animalia
- Phylum: Arthropoda
- Class: Insecta
- Order: Diptera
- Family: Syrphidae
- Genus: Callicera
- Species: C. rufa

Binomial name
- Callicera rufa Schummel, 1842

Species of fly

Callicera rufa is a Palearctic hoverfly.

== Description ==
For terms see Morphology of Diptera
External images A large (Wing length 9·75-11·25 mm.) metallic fly with red fur and long black antennae. Antennae segment 1 at least twice as long as 2 with a short arista (more so in male) which is bulbous at the base, then thread-like. The tergites are shining black, 2 and 3 with dull blackish markings The pubescence of tergites entirely tawny red (tergite 4 is more or less extensively black-haired in some individuals). The legs are yellow-red, the last two tarsal segments darkened. The larva is illustrated in colour by Rotheray.

== Distribution ==
Scotland, Belgium, Netherlands, Germany, Poland, Hungary, Balaearic islands, Pyrenees, Corsica, Italy, Greece, and Romania. Not known from the east Palaearctic.

== Habitat ==
Ancient Pinus sylvestris forest.

== Biology ==
Arboreal, but females descend to visit stumps of old pine trees in small forest clearings, or to visit rot-holes. Flowers visited include Ranunculus repens. The flight period is mid May to August.
