= Liothorax subaeneus =

Scientific classification
- Kingdom: Animalia
- Phylum: Arthropoda
- Clade: Pancrustacea
- Class: Insecta
- Order: Coleoptera
- Suborder: Polyphaga
- Infraorder: Scarabaeiformia
- Family: Scarabaeidae
- Genus: Liothorax
- Species: L. subaeneus

Binomial name
- Liothorax subaeneus (LeConte, 1857)

Synonyms
- Aphodius subaeneus LeConte, 1857; Aphodius perpolitus Gordon, 1973; Aphodius gentneri Hatch, 1971

Species of beetle

Liothorax subaeneus is a species of beetle of the family Scarabaeidae. It is found in the United States (California, Oregon) and Canada (British Columbia).

== Description ==
Adults reach a length of about 4–5 mm (0.16–0.20 in). They have an oblong, moderately convex, mostly weakly shiny, glabrous, black body. The margin of the clypeus and sides of the pronotum are red, the latter with an aeneous tinge. The elytra are dirty yellow on the disc, with the first interstria and lateral margin black. The legs are rufo-piceous and the antennal club is piceous.

== Life history ==
Specimens have been collected along the margins of ponds.
