= Callicerini =

Scientific classification
- Domain: Eukaryota
- Kingdom: Animalia
- Phylum: Arthropoda
- Class: Insecta
- Order: Diptera
- Family: Syrphidae
- Subfamily: Eristalinae
- Tribe: Callicerini; Rondani, 1856

Genera
- Callicera Panzer, 1809; Notiocheilosia Thompson, 1972

Tribe of flies

Callicerini, or Calliceratini, is a tribe of hoverflies.

== List of genera ==
- Callicera Panzer, 1809
- Notiocheilosia Thompson, 1972
