= Segmentina mica =

Scientific classification
- Kingdom: Animalia
- Phylum: Mollusca
- Class: Gastropoda
- Superorder: Hygrophila
- Family: Planorbidae
- Genus: Segmentina
- Species: S. mica

Binomial name
- Segmentina mica (Westerlund, 1883)

Synonyms
- Segmentina nitidella (Martens, 1877)

Species of gastropod

Segmentina mica is a species of gastropods belonging to the family Planorbidae.

The species is in Japan, Southeastern Asia.
