= Liothorax alternatus =

Scientific classification
- Kingdom: Animalia
- Phylum: Arthropoda
- Clade: Pancrustacea
- Class: Insecta
- Order: Coleoptera
- Suborder: Polyphaga
- Infraorder: Scarabaeiformia
- Family: Scarabaeidae
- Genus: Liothorax
- Species: L. alternatus

Binomial name
- Liothorax alternatus (Horn, 1870)

Synonyms
- Aphodius alternatus Horn, 1870; Aphodius (Calamosternus) moclipsi Hatch, 1971; Aphodius inermis Robinson, 1940

Species of beetle

Liothorax alternatus is a species of beetle of the family Scarabaeidae. It is found in Canada (Alberta, British Columbia, Manitoba, Ontario, Saskatchewan) and the United States (California, Colorado, Idaho, Iowa, Michigan, Montana, Nevada, New Mexico, North Dakota, Oregon, South Dakota, Utah, Washington, Wisconsin, Wyoming).

== Description ==
Adults reach a length of about 4–6 mm (0.16–0.24 in). They have a moderately elongate, convex, shiny, glabrous, black body. The margin of the clypeus is red and the pronotum is red laterally. The interstriae on the elytra are alternating yellow and black. The legs are reddish brown and the antennal club is piceous.

== Life history ==
Specimens have been found along the margins of ponds and streams.
