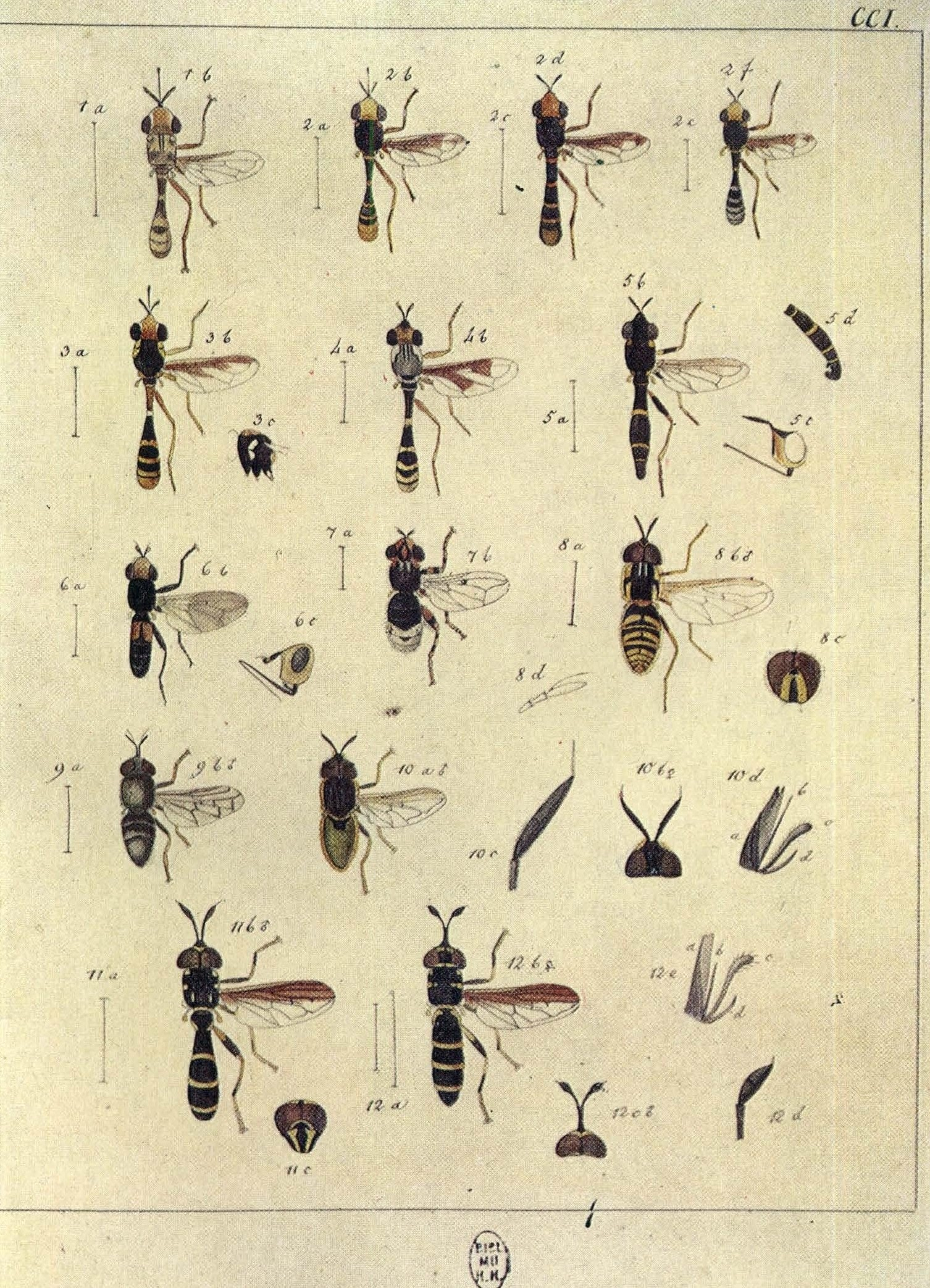
- Illustration in Johann Wilhelm Meigen Europäischen Zweiflügeligen Figure 10

Scientific classification
- Kingdom: Animalia
- Phylum: Arthropoda
- Clade: Pancrustacea
- Class: Insecta
- Order: Diptera
- Family: Syrphidae
- Subfamily: Eristalinae
- Tribe: Callicerini
- Genus: Callicera; Panzer, 1809
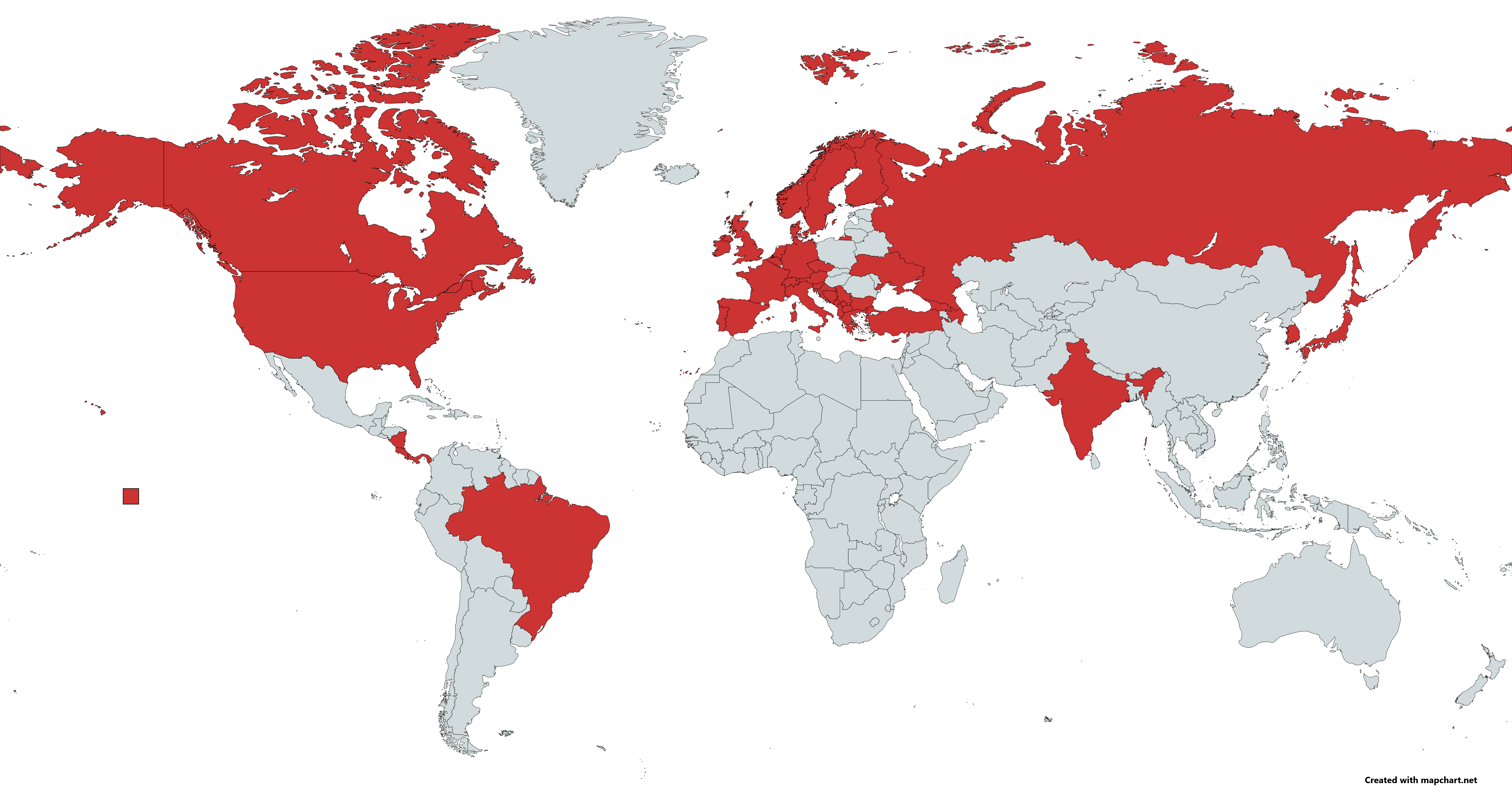
- Range map 2023

= Callicera =

Genus of flies

Callicera is a Holarctic genus of hoverflies.

They are beautiful metallic flies, with strikingly long antennae are medium-sized to rather large (wing length 9·75–15 mm.) bumblebee mimics. All the species are considered rare. Callicera larvae live in the moist rot-holes of overmature trees as saprophages. Callicera have been used as bioindicators.

== Species ==
The following species are assigned to this genus:

- Callicera aenea (Fabricius, 1777)
- Callicera aurata (Rossi, 1790)
- Callicera christiani Ghorpadé, 1982
- Callicera doleschalli Verrall, 1913
- Callicera duncani Curran, 1935
- Callicera erratica (Walker, 1849)
- Callicera exigua Smit, 2014
- Callicera fagesii Guérin-Méneville, 1844
- Callicera loewi Verrall, 1913
- Callicera macquartii Rondani, 1843
- Callicera montensis Snow, 1892
- Callicera nitens Coe, 1964
- Callicera poultoni Verrall, 1913
- Callicera robusta Coe, 1964
- Callicera rufa Schummel, 1841
- Callicera sackeni Verrall, 1913
- Callicera scintilla
- Callicera spinolae Rondani, 1843
- Callicera sumatrensis Meijere, 1919

== External images ==
- Images representing Callicera
