= Liothorax discoides =

Scientific classification
- Kingdom: Animalia
- Phylum: Arthropoda
- Clade: Pancrustacea
- Class: Insecta
- Order: Coleoptera
- Suborder: Polyphaga
- Infraorder: Scarabaeiformia
- Family: Scarabaeidae
- Genus: Liothorax
- Species: L. discoides

Binomial name
- Liothorax discoides (Schmidt, 1917)

Synonyms
- Aphodius discoides Schmidt, 1917; Aphodius plagiatus discoides Schmidt, 1917; Aphodius plagiatus var. discoides Schmidt, 1916; Aphodius (Nialus) bytinskisalzi Petrovitz, 1971; Aphodius (Nialus) plagiatus discus Reitter, 1892; Aphodius plagiatus var. discus Reitter, 1892

Species of beetle

Liothorax discoides is a species of beetle of the family Scarabaeidae. It is found in Israel, Syria and Turkey.

== Description ==
Adults reach a length of about 3.4–4.8 mm (0.13–0.19 in). The head is black and finely and sparsely double punctate. The maxillary palpi are blackish brown, the antennae medium brown and the club darker. The pronotum is black with the anterior and lateral margins vaguely browned. The scutellum is glossy dark brown. The central area of the elytra is typically dull yellowish-brown, with the sutural interstice darker.
