= Liothorax bameuli =

Scientific classification
- Kingdom: Animalia
- Phylum: Arthropoda
- Clade: Pancrustacea
- Class: Insecta
- Order: Coleoptera
- Suborder: Polyphaga
- Infraorder: Scarabaeiformia
- Family: Scarabaeidae
- Genus: Liothorax
- Species: L. bameuli

Binomial name
- Liothorax bameuli (Angus, Maté, Angus & Král, 2024)

Synonyms
- Aphodius (Liothorax) bameuli Angus, Maté, Angus & Král, 2024

Species of beetle

Liothorax bameuli is a species of beetle of the family Scarabaeidae. It is found in France (Corsica).

== Description ==
Adults reach a length of about 3.9–4.8 mm (0.15–0.19 in). They are glossy black, with the tarsi and tibial spurs dark brown, and the femora and tibiae dark brown with black-bronze reflections.

== Life history ==
Specimens have been found in cow dung.

== Etymology ==
The species is named in honour of Dr Franck Bameul.
