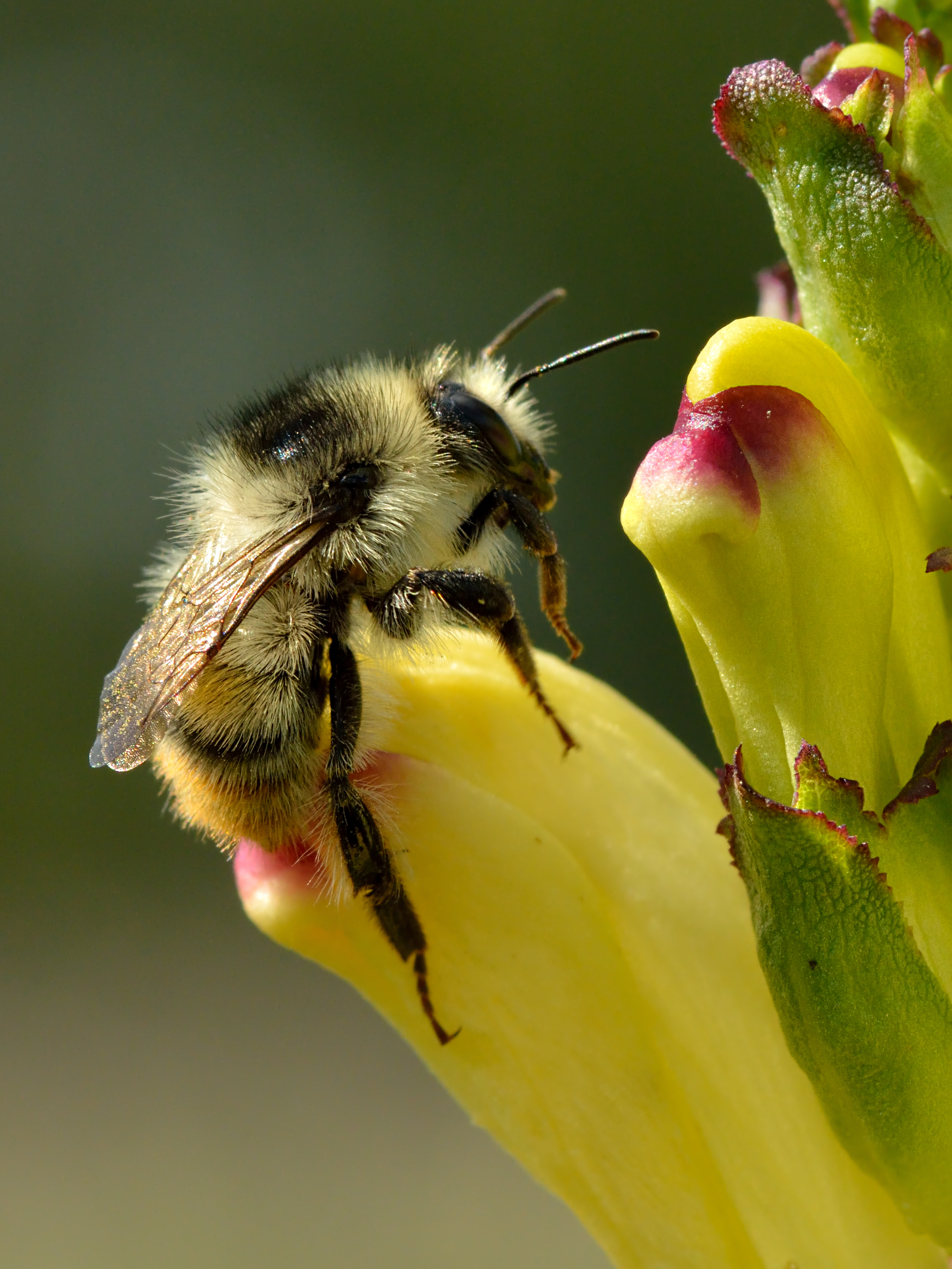

Conservation status
- Least Concern (IUCN 3.1)

Scientific classification
- Kingdom: Animalia
- Phylum: Arthropoda
- Class: Insecta
- Order: Hymenoptera
- Family: Apidae
- Genus: Bombus
- Subgenus: Thoracobombus
- Species: B. sylvarum

Binomial name
- Bombus sylvarum Linnaeus, 1761

= Bombus sylvarum =

Species of bee

Bombus sylvarum, the shrill carder bee or knapweed carder-bee, is a species of bumblebee with a wide distribution across Europe, east to the Ural Mountains, and north to Great Britain, Ireland, and southern Scandinavia.

It is called the "shrill carder" because the pitch of its buzzing is more shrill than other bees and it is a carder bee – making its nest by carding material into a fabric.

== Description ==
It is a small bumblebee; queens are 16–18 mm (0.63–0.71 in) long and female workers are 10–15 mm (0.39–0.59 in). It is mostly pale yellowish in colour with a black band across the thorax, two black bands across the abdomen, and an orange tip to the abdomen. It flies rapidly and queens produce a high-pitched buzz.

== Behaviour ==
The flight period lasts from about April to September. The queen bee emerges from hibernation in the spring. She makes a nest on or slightly below the surface of the ground among open vegetation. An old mouse or vole nest may be used. By summer, the nest may contain around 100 worker bees. Each nest requires about 10 km^{2} (3.9 sq mi) of suitable habitat.

It occurs in herb-rich grassland where it feeds on nectar and pollen from a variety of flowers, especially ones that are complex or have long corollae. Important food plants include knapweed, woundwort, clover, vetch, red bartsia, and narrow-leaved bird's-foot trefoil.

== Status and conservation ==
It is threatened by habitat loss and intensification of agriculture and is declining in numbers across Europe. In the United Kingdom, it was common until the early 20th century, but is now restricted to a few small areas in southern England and south and west Wales. The species is included in the United Kingdom Biodiversity Action Plan. It is also an endangered species in Ireland.

== Gallery ==
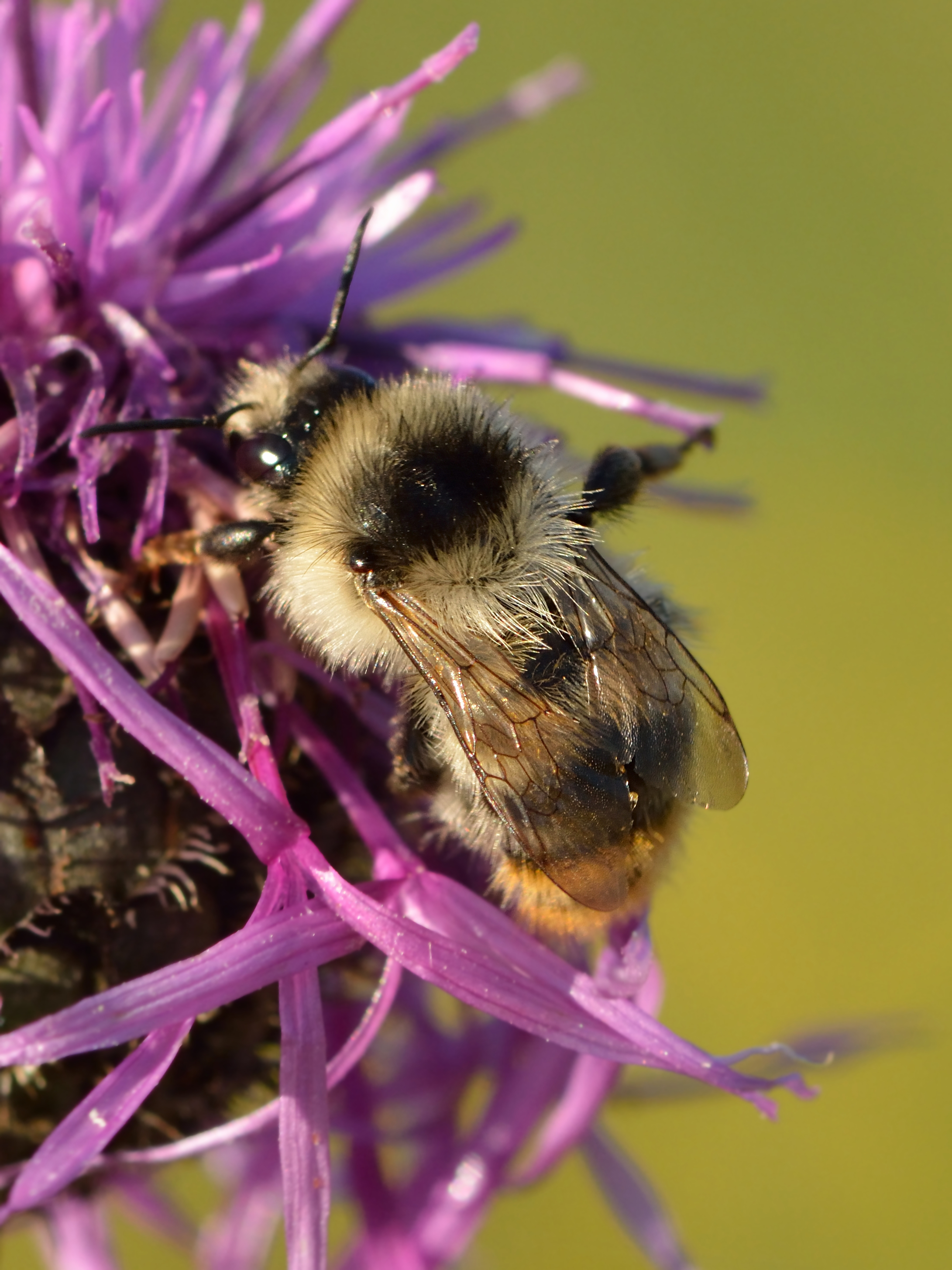
Worker

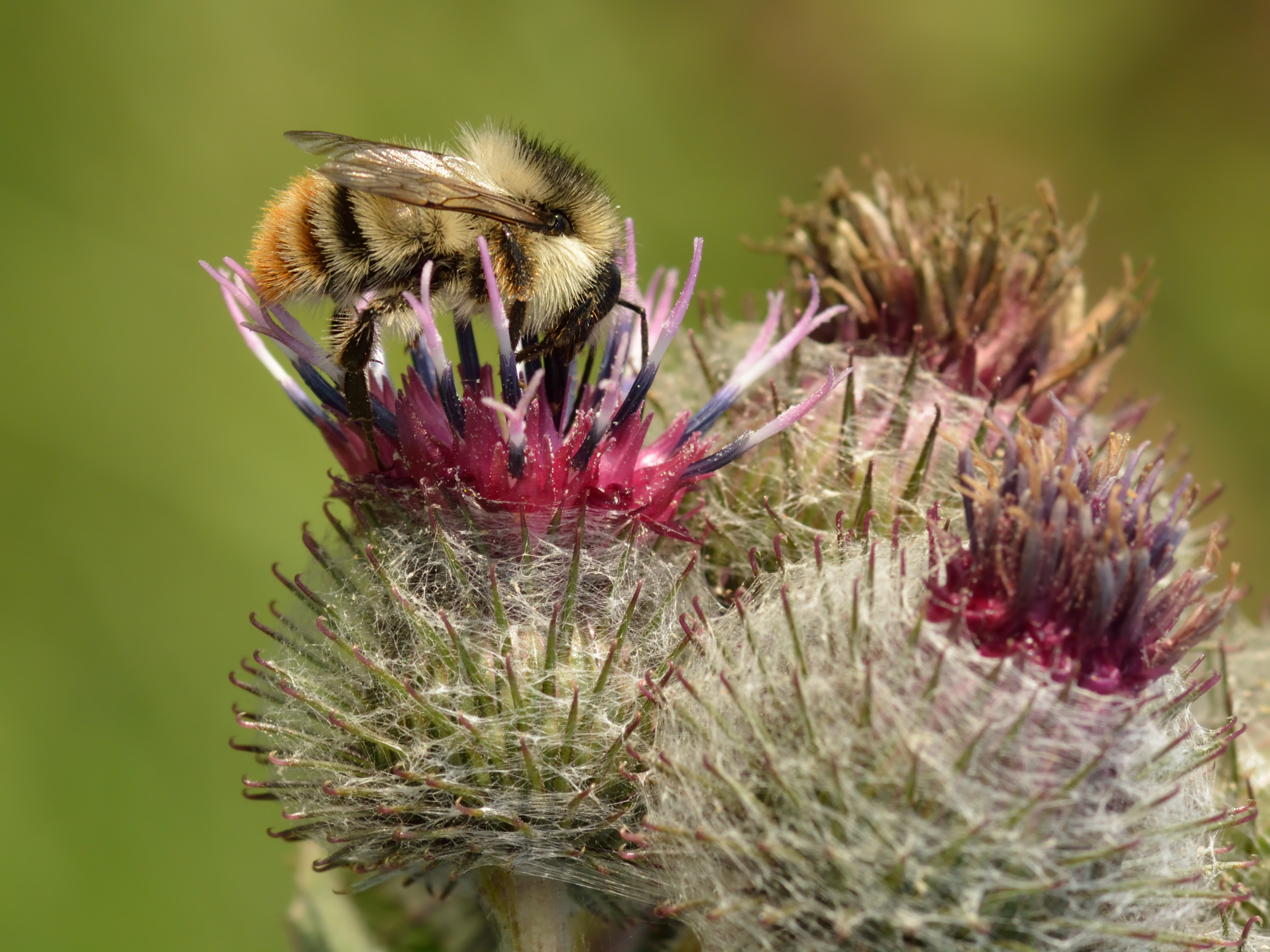
Worker

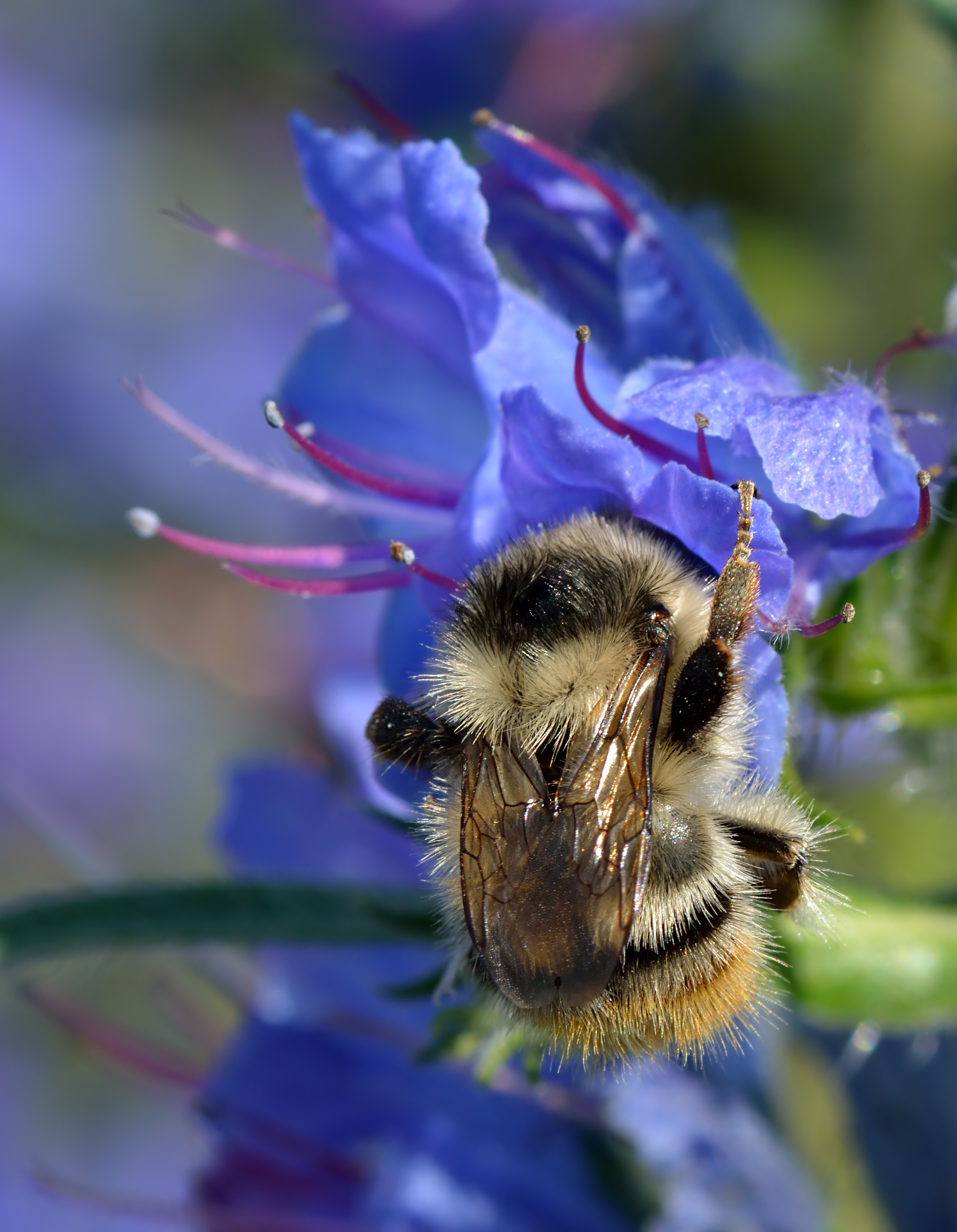
Queen

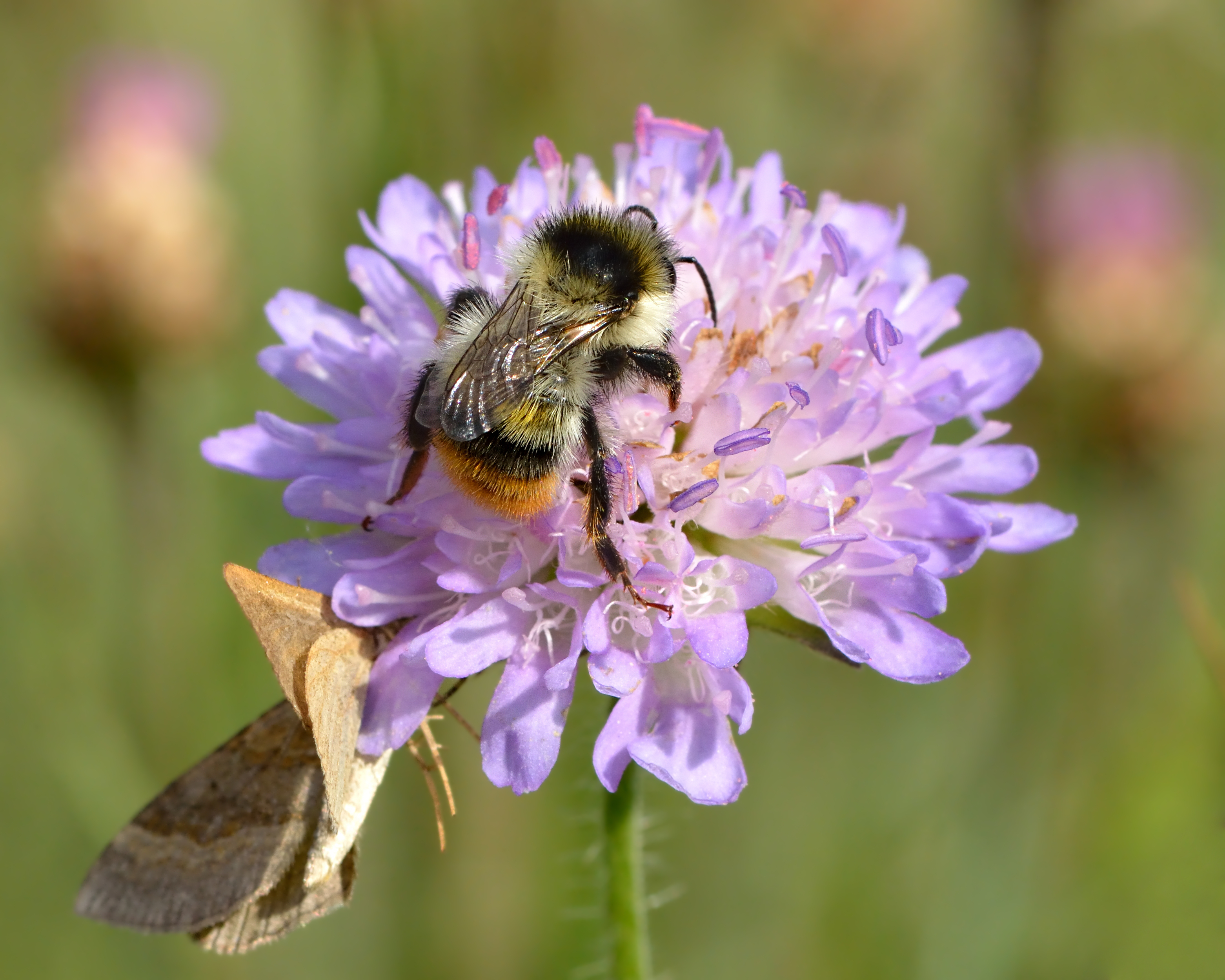
Male
