= List of habitats of principal importance in Wales =

Aerial view of seven of the most important raised bogs sites in Wales; Natural Resources Wales, 2017.

Wales is obliged by law to maintain lists of species and habitats of principal importance for biodiversity conservation; the other countries within the UK: Scotland, England and Northern Ireland, have their own laws for this purpose.

Public bodies, including local authorities now have a legal duty to have regard to conserving biodiversity in the exercise of their normal functions. In Wales, that obligation originally derived from section 42 of the Natural Environment and Rural Communities (NERC) Act 2006. However, this requirement for Wales has since been superseded by an almost identical requirement enshrined within the Environment (Wales) Act 2016.

== Selection ==
The habitats that have been designated to be of "principal importance for the purpose of conserving biodiversity" derive from lists originally drawn up for the UK Biodiversity Action Plan (UK BAP). These lists were reviewed in 2007, and the total number of UK BAP habitats increased from 45 to 65, and the number of UK BAP species increased from under 600 to 1,150.

From these, the formal list just for Wales (and laid out below) now contains 53 of those 65 habitats.

=== Legal obligations ===
Section 6 of the Environment (Wales) Act 2016 places a legal obligation on public bodies in Wales to 'maintain and enhance biodiversity' whilst carrying out their functions. Section 7 of that Act requires Welsh Ministers to publish and maintain lists of species and types of habitats in Wales that are regarded as of 'principal importance' for the purpose of maintaining and enhancing that biodiversity. This section of the Act replaces the biodiversity duty originally outlined in Section 42 of the NERC Act 2006 for both England and Wales.

=== Significance ===
Awareness of the presence of any priority habitat or priority species identified on these lists is of importance within the local authority planning process when land is considered for development. Along with legally protected species, as well as statutory and non-statutory sites, knowledge of the presence of priority habitats and priority species is required if the impact of future development is to be avoided or mitigated. Planning Policy Wales indicates that, when determining planning applications, the existence of priority habitats are of greater status than others. By fully considering all these features in the decision-making process, a planning authority will have demonstrated that it has discharged its duty to conserve biodiversity.

== Habitats of 'principal importance' in Wales ==
The list shows the broad habitat group, followed by name of the habitat of 'principal importance'.

=== Terrestrial, coastal & freshwater habitats ===
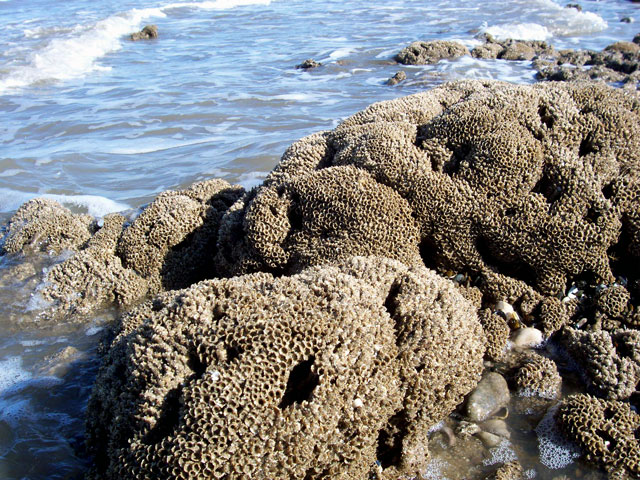
Sabellaria alveolata habitat at Llanddulas, Conwy

- Arable and horticultural: Arable field margins
- Bogs: Blanket bog
- Bogs: Lowland raised bog
- Fen, marsh and swamp: Lowland fens
- Fen, marsh and swamp: Purple moor grass and rush pastures
- Fen, marsh and swamp: Reedbeds
- Fen, marsh and swamp: Upland flushes, fens and swamps
- Grassland (acid): Lowland dry acid grassland
- Grassland (calcareous): Lowland calcareous grassland
- Grassland (calcareous): Upland calcareous grassland
- Grassland (improved): Coastal and floodplain grazing marsh
- Grassland (neutral): Lowland meadows
- Heath: Lowland heathland
- Heath: Upland heathland
- Inland rock: Calaminarian grasslands
- Inland rock: Inland rock outcrop and scree habitats
- Inland rock: Limestone pavement
- Inland rock: Open mosaic habitats on previously developed land
- Montane habitats: Mountain heaths and willow scrub
- Rivers and streams: Rivers
- Standing open waters/canals: Aquifer-fed naturally fluctuating water bodies
- Standing open waters/canals: Eutrophic standing waters
- Standing open waters/canals: Mesotrophic lakes
- Standing open waters/canals: Oligotrophic and dystrophic lakes
- Standing open waters/canals: Ponds
- Supralittoral rock: Maritime cliff and slopes
- Supralittoral sediment: Coastal sand dunes
- Supralittoral sediment: Coastal vegetated shingle
- Woodland: Traditional orchards
- Woodland: Wood pasture & parkland
- Woodland: Hedgerows
- Woodland: Lowland beech and yew woodland
- Woodland: Lowland mixed deciduous woodland
- Woodland: Upland mixed ash woodland
- Woodland: Upland oak woodland
- Woodland: Wet woodland

=== Marine habitats ===
- Littoral rock: Estuarine rocky habitats
- Littoral rock: Intertidal boulder communities
- Littoral rock: Sabellaria alveolata reefs
- Littoral sediment: Coastal saltmarsh
- Littoral sediment: Intertidal mudflats
- Littoral sediment: Peat and clay exposures
- Littoral sediment: Seagrass beds
- Littoral sediment: Sheltered muddy gravels
- Sublittoral rock: Carbonate reefs
- Sublittoral rock: Fragile sponge & anthozoan communities on subtidal rocky habitats
- Sublittoral rock: Tidal swept channels
- Sublittoral sediment: Blue mussel beds
- Sublittoral sediment: Horse mussel beds
- Sublittoral sediment: Mixed muddy sediments
- Sublittoral sediment: Mud habitats in deep water
- Sublittoral sediment: Musculus discors beds
- Sublittoral sediment: Subtidal sands and gravels

== See also ==
List of species and habitats of principal importance in England
