= Stenus palposus =

Scientific classification
- Domain: Eukaryota
- Kingdom: Animalia
- Phylum: Arthropoda
- Class: Insecta
- Order: Coleoptera
- Suborder: Polyphaga
- Infraorder: Staphyliniformia
- Family: Staphylinidae
- Genus: Stenus
- Species: S. palposus

Binomial name
- Stenus palposus Zetterstedt, 1838

Species of beetle

Stenus palposus (also known as Metastenus palposus or the Lough Neagh camphor beetle) is a species of beetle of the subfamily Steninae in the family Staphylinidae. As a predatory insect, it feeds on other smaller arthropods such as springtails.

It is now restricted to parts of northern Europe such as Sweden, Finland and Russia, having gone extinct in areas like Lough Neagh in Northern Ireland sometime before 1996. It lives in damp areas of open fine sand beaches where they have been observed hunting by running their prey down.

== Biology ==
Belonging to the rove beetle family, Staphylinidae, these beetles have a segmented abdomen, with shortened wing cases and are typically very small. Due to their similarity, the Staphylinidae beetles are quite difficult to identify, however their silvery hairs on their elytra are a unique identifier for this species. The Steninae have two glands near the base of the tail which release a surfactant that can propel them across water.

== Ecology ==
Stenus palposus was observed on the damp, fine sanded shores of Lough Neagh showing rapid stop-start movement. It is very agile - probably a useful adaptation for living in open, sandy habitats. Their possible major food source is collembola such as Anurida maritima which is common on the beaches of Lough Neagh although it was observed to stalk an ephydrid (Diptera) from behind. Overall, very little information on S. palposus currently exists making this an important target species for further research.

== Threats and conservation ==
Stenus palposus has been threatened by pollution, erosion and disturbance of their natural habitat. Lough Neagh, Northern Ireland, is a fine sanded beach habitat which is threatened by these factors, and also contains a wide range of beetle fauna ^{[1]}. A 2006 survey found no extant populations of S. palposus in Northern Ireland. Due to the extinction threat posed on this species, it was placed on the UK Biodiversity Action Plan priority species list in 2007 as well as the Northern Ireland Biodiversity list as a priority species in 2010.

== Distribution ==
Range of countries where still found:

- Sweden
- Finland
- Germany
- Norway
- Netherlands
- Russia
- Austria
- Switzerland
- Liechtenstein
- Denmark

Last documented in the UK 1983.
