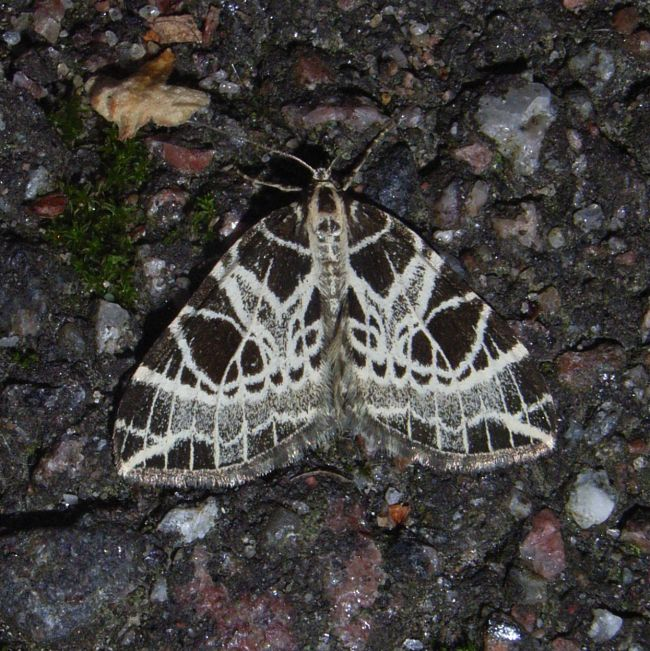

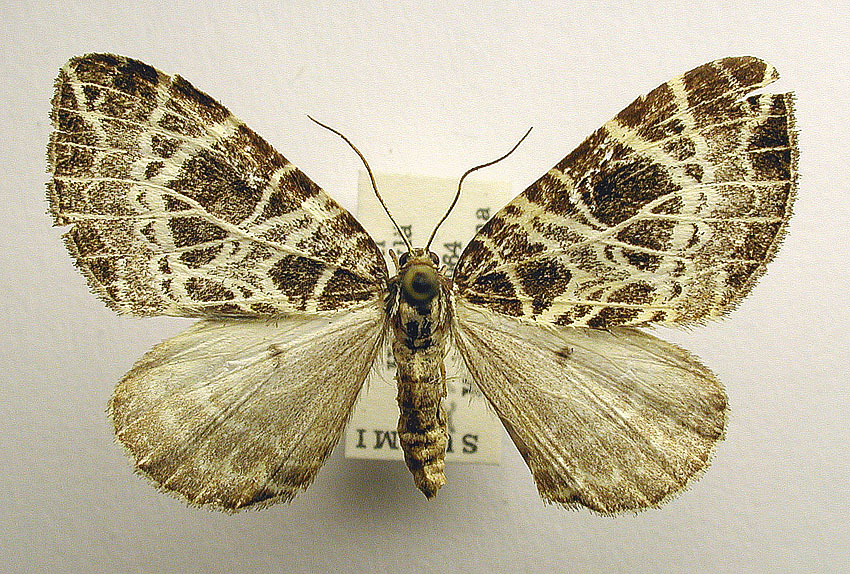

Scientific classification
- Kingdom: Animalia
- Phylum: Arthropoda
- Clade: Pancrustacea
- Class: Insecta
- Order: Lepidoptera
- Family: Geometridae
- Genus: Eustroma
- Species: E. reticulatum

Binomial name
- Eustroma reticulatum (Denis & Schiffermüller, 1775)

Synonyms
- Geometra reticulata Denis & Schiffermüller, 1775

= Eustroma reticulatum =

Netted carpet

Species of moth

Eustroma reticulatum, the netted carpet, is a moth of the family Geometridae. The species was first described in 1775, by the Austrian lepidopterists Michael Denis and Ignaz Schiffermüller.

== Description ==
The wingspan is 20–25 millimetres (0.79–0.98 in). There is one generation per year and the moths are on wing in July and August, flying from dusk. They come to light and can be disturbed by day amongst the foodplant, or can be seen resting nearby.

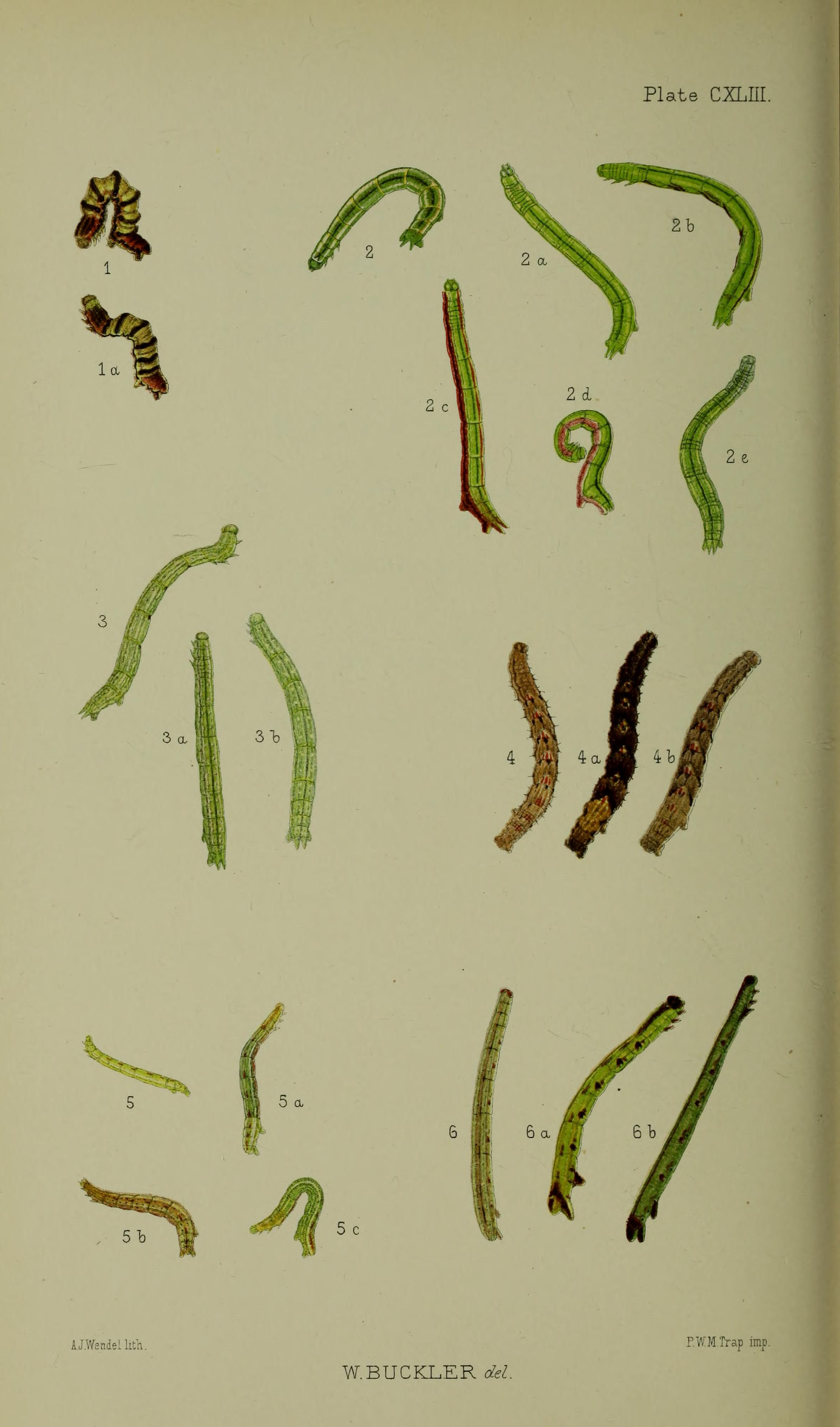
Figs.5, 5a, 5b 5c larvae in various stages

Eggs are laid singly on the foodplant and the larvae are found from July to September. They feed at night on touch-me-not balsam (Impatiens noli-tangere), at first making holes in the leaves and later within the developing seedpods. In captivity they will feed on other balsams such as orange balsam (Impatiens capensis) but not on Indian balsam (Impatiens glandulifera) which is naturalised in the Lake District and outcompetes touch-me-not balsam.

Overwinters as a pupa on moist ground, near the foodplant, in an earthen cocoon.

== Distribution ==
It is found in Europe, western and central Siberia, northern Mongolia, the Amur region, Khabarovsk, Primorsk, Sakhalin, Kurils, China, the Korean Peninsula and Japan.

Great Britain

It is one of the rarest species of moth in Great Britain and is found in the Lake District and two sites in north Lancashire. The moth was close to near extinction in the 1980s and 1990s, but monitoring of nineteen sites shows that the moth is responding well to conservation management with more than 900% increase in abundance since 2000. The moth was previousLy found in Wales; near Bala in 1930 and near Dolgellau in 1973.

== Subspecies ==
- Eustroma reticulatum reticulatum (Europe, Siberia)
- Eustroma reticulatum chosensicola (Amur, Sakhalin, Kurils)
- Eustroma reticulatum dictyotum (eastern Asia)
- Eustroma reticulatum obsoletum (Kamchatka)
