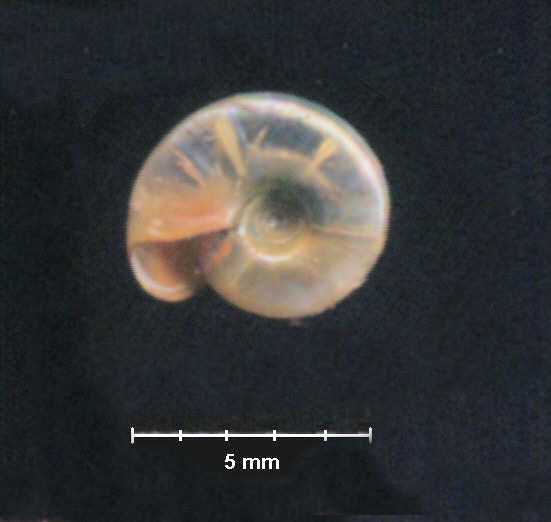
- Apical view of a shell of Segmentina nitida

Scientific classification
- Kingdom: Animalia
- Phylum: Mollusca
- Class: Gastropoda
- Superorder: Hygrophila
- Family: Planorbidae
- Genus: Segmentina
- Species: S. nitida

Binomial name
- Segmentina nitida (O. F. Müller, 1774)

= Segmentina nitida =

Species of gastropod

Segmentina nitida, the shining ram's-horn snail, is a species of small, air-breathing, freshwater snail. Taxonomically, the S. nitida is an aquatic gastropod mollusc or micromollusc in the family Planorbidae, commonly called the ramshorn snails.

== Description ==
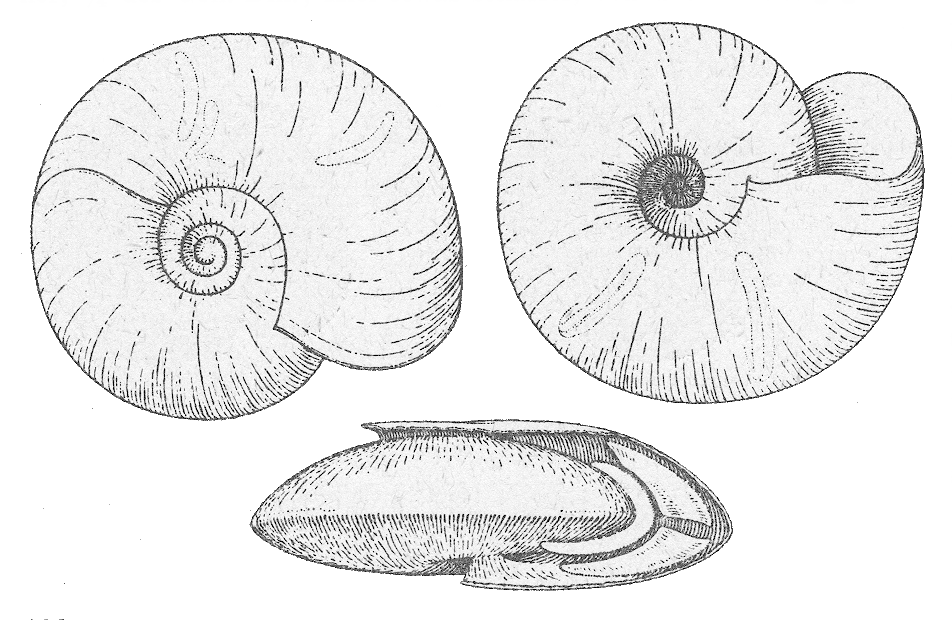
Drawing showing three views of a shell of Segmentina nitida

The shell of this species is sinistral in coiling and almost planispiral in shape. The spire is deeply sunken. The surface of the shell is glossy.

The maximum shell diameter is about 7 mm.

== Habitat ==
This species lives in water weeds, in ponds and marsh drainage ditches. It is uncommon to rare.

== Distribution ==
This species occurs in countries and islands including:

- Czech Republic - vulnerable (VU)
- British Isles - listed in List of endangered species in the British Isles.
  - Great Britain in England - endangered (EN)
- Germany - endangered (gefährdet)
- Latvia
- Netherlands
- Poland
- Slovakia
