= Callicera aurata =

Conservation status
- Vulnerable (IUCN 3.1)

Scientific classification
- Kingdom: Animalia
- Phylum: Arthropoda
- Class: Insecta
- Order: Diptera
- Family: Syrphidae
- Genus: Callicera
- Species: C. aurata

Binomial name
- Callicera aurata (Rossi, 1790)

Species of hoverfly

Callicera aurata, commonly known as the golden long-horned hoverfly, is a species of hoverfly, within the genus Callicera and family Syrphidae.

It was first described by Italian entomologist Pietro Rossi in 1790.

It is considered rare and currently listed as vulnerable under The IUCN Red List of Threatened Species.
