= Liothorax niger =

Scientific classification
- Kingdom: Animalia
- Phylum: Arthropoda
- Clade: Pancrustacea
- Class: Insecta
- Order: Coleoptera
- Suborder: Polyphaga
- Infraorder: Scarabaeiformia
- Family: Scarabaeidae
- Genus: Liothorax
- Species: L. niger

Binomial name
- Liothorax niger (Illiger, 1798)

Synonyms
- Aphodius niger Illiger, 1798

Species of beetle

Liothorax niger, the beaulieu dung beetle, is a species of beetle of the family Scarabaeidae. It is found in Armenia, Austria, Belarus, Belgium, Bosnia and Herzegovina, Bulgaria, China (Xizang), Croatia, the Czech Republic, Denmark, Estonia, Finland, France, Georgia, Germany, Great Britain, Hungary, Italy, Kazakhstan, Kyrgyzstan, Latvia, Lithuania, the Netherlands, Norway, Poland, Portugal, Romania, Russia, Slovakia, Spain, Sweden, Switzerland, Turkey, Turkmenistan and Ukraine.

== Description ==
Adults reach a length of about 4.2–4.8 mm (0.17–0.19 in). The head is black, with the antennae and palpi blackish-brown. The pronotum and scutellum are glossy black and the elytra are black.

== Life history ==
In the New Forest (England), specimens are typically taken at the edges of pools and ditches in April-May, but when large numbers are taken it is almost always due to inwash from the surrounding grassland after heavy rain. In Sweden, the beetles have been seen burrowing in trampled organic mud. Very occasionally, specimens are taken in dung. These are rare, random occurrences and may sometimes result from the beetle taking shelter from drought. This species may show dramatic fluctuations in abundance.
