= United Kingdom Biodiversity Action Plan =

British response to the Convention on Biological Diversity

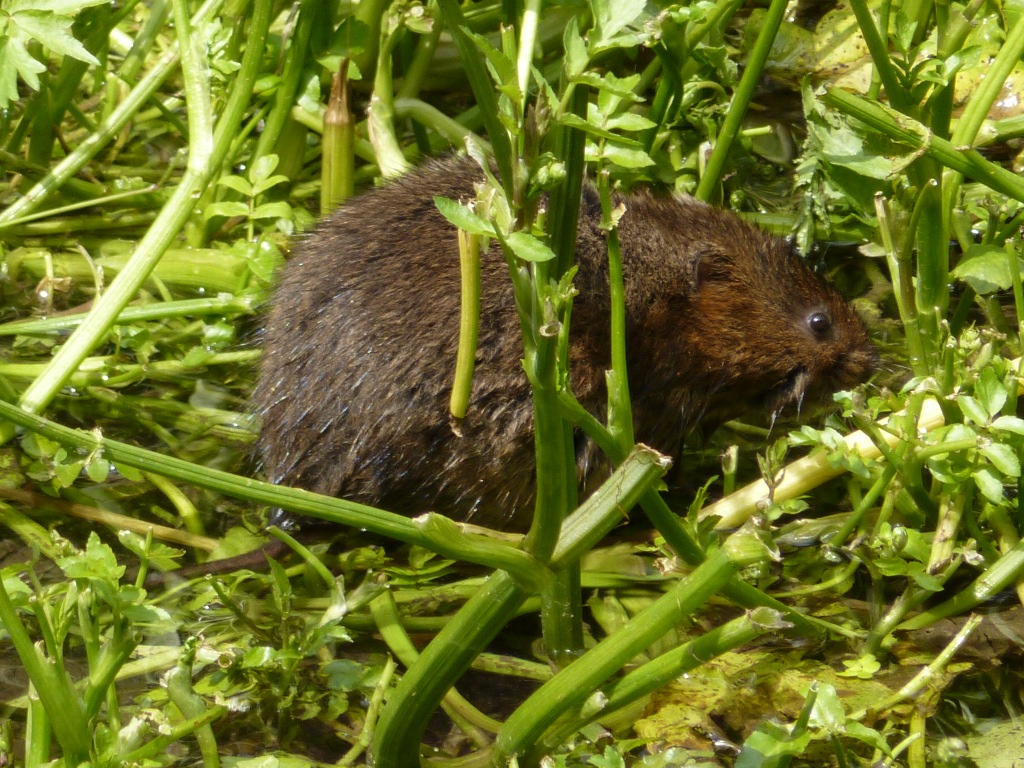
Water vole (Arvicola amphibius) - a 'Priority Species', listed in the UK BAP.

The United Kingdom Biodiversity Action Plan (UK BAP) was the UK government's response to the Convention on Biological Diversity, opened for signature at the Rio Earth Summit in 1992. The UK was the first country to produce a national Biodiversity Action Plan. It was published in 1994 and created action plans for priority species and habitats in the UK that were most under threat so as to support their recovery.

== Purpose ==
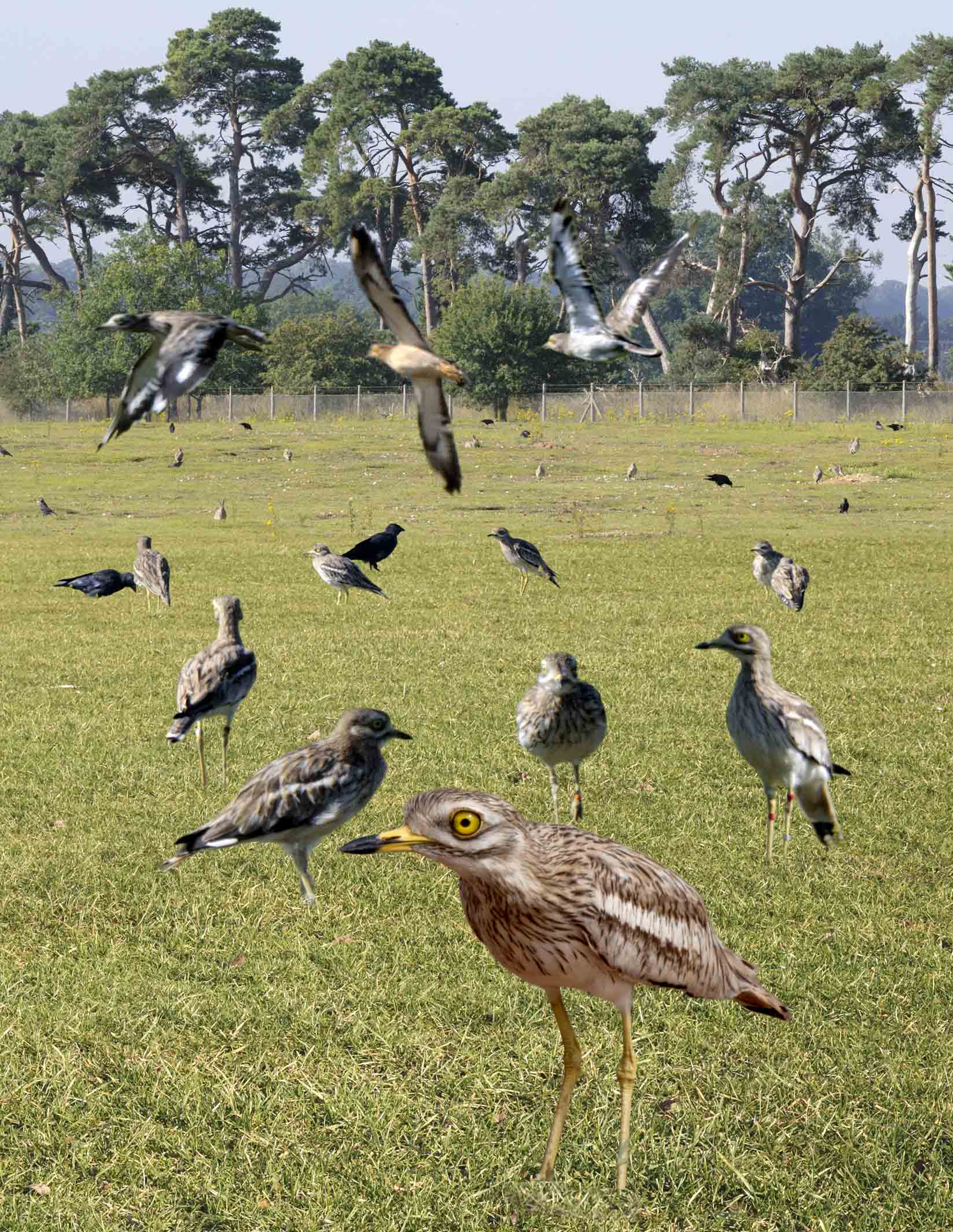
The Stone Curlew Action Plan in the original 1994 UK BAP aimed to enhance the English breeding population from around 160 pairs to 200 pairs by the year 2000

The UK Biodiversity Action Plan summarised the most threatened or rapidly declining biological resources of the United Kingdom, and gave detailed plans for their conservation. Individual 'Action Plans' were provided for these habitats and species, and a reporting mechanism was established to demonstrate how the UK BAP was contributing to the United Kingdom's commitment to help reduce or halt the significant losses in global biodiversity, highlighted by the international Convention on Biological Diversity. The original publication included action plans for 45 habitats and 391 species, each identified either as being globally threatened, or where evidence showed there had been a particularly rapid decline of those resources within the UK. Although mainly focused on England, Wales, Scotland, Northern Ireland and the UK Crown dependencies, the UK Biodiversity Action Plan also addressed issues of declining species and habitats overseas in the UK Dependant Territories and British-held territories in Antarctica; areas together containing over 700 endemic species.

== History ==
At the launch of Biodiversity: The UK Action Plan in January 1994, the UK Prime Minister announced the formation of a 'Biodiversity Steering Group', drawing on experts from key conservation organisations and government agencies. It was tasked with identifying and preparing costed action plans for priority species and habitats by 1995, and with developing methodologies for monitoring progress and improving public awareness and access to biodiversity information. In 1995 the Biodiversity Steering Group published a two-volume report, the second part of which contained three important lists of species:

- a 'Long List' contained 1252 species, selected using broad criteria;
- a 'Middle List' contained over 300 species for which action plans should be produced over the subsequent three years;
- a 'Short List' of 116 species for which action plans had already been devised.

The criteria for selection as a Biodiversity Action Plan species on the 'long list' were:

1. being a species where the UK holds more than a quarter of its world population;
2. being a species where its numbers or distribution range have declined by more than 25% over the last 25 years;
3. being (in some cases) a species found in less than fifteen 10 kilometre squares in the UK;
4. being listed in the EU Birds or Habitats Directives, the Bern, Bonn or CITES Conventions, or under the Wildlife and Countryside Act 1981 or the Nature Conservation and Amenity Lands (Northern Ireland) Order 1985.

After devolution in 1998, England, Wales and Scotland had all developed their own individual biodiversity strategies by 2002, with Northern Ireland following shortly afterwards, whilst still also collaborating.

By 2007 the criteria used to select priority habitats and priority species had been reviewed and the lists updated to propose that 40 UK BAP habitats and 1,149 species were included in the UK priority lists, and a further 123 species were proposed for removal.

As of 2009 1,150 species and 65 habitats were identified as needing conservation and greater protection and were covered by UK BAPs. The updated list included the hedgehog, house sparrow, grass snake and the garden tiger moth, while otters, bottlenose dolphins and red squirrels remained in need of habitat protection.

In 2012 the UK Biodiversity Action Plan was succeeded by the 'UK Post-2010 Biodiversity Framework'. This was produced on behalf of the Four Countries' Biodiversity Group (4CBG) by Defra and the JNCC. But the work identifying priority species and priority habitats remains relevant, and was then enshrined in appendices to the NERC Act (2006).

== Priority species and priority habitats ==
As the UK BAP developed, the most important species and habitats that it identified for action were referred to as 'priority species' and 'priority habitats' ( also: 'UK BAP species' and UK BAP habitats').

=== Priority habitats ===
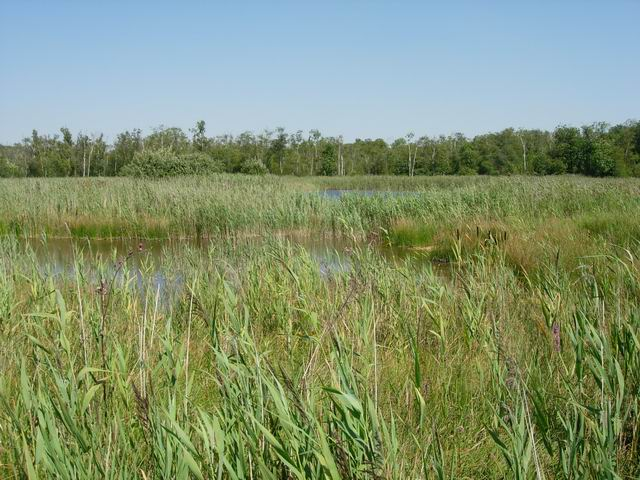
Reedbed at Chippenham Fen - a UK Priority Habitat

- Rivers
- Oligotrophic and dystrophic Lakes
- Ponds
- Mesotrophic lakes
- Eutrophic standing waters
- Aquifer fed naturally fluctuating water bodies
- Arable field margins
- Hedgerows
- Traditional orchards
- Wood-pasture and parkland
- Upland oakwood
- Lowland beech and yew woodland
- Upland mixed ashwoods
- Wet woodland
- Lowland mixed deciduous woodland
- Upland birchwoods
- Native pine woodlands
- Lowland dry acid grassland
- Lowland calcareous grassland
- Upland calcareous grassland
- Lowland meadows
- Upland hay meadows
- Coastal and floodplain grazing marsh
- Lowland heathland
- Upland heathland
- Upland flushes, fens and swamps
- Purple moor grass and rush pastures
- Lowland fens
- Reedbeds
- Lowland raised bog
- Blanket bog
- Mountain heaths and willow scrub
- Inland rock outcrop and scree habitats
- Calaminarian grasslands
- Open mosaic habitats on previously developed land
- Limestone pavement
- Maritime cliff and slopes
- Coastal vegetated shingle
- Machair
- Coastal sand dunes
- Intertidal chalk
- Intertidal boulder communities
- Sabellaria alveolata reefs
- Coastal saltmarsh
- Intertidal mudflats
- Seagrass beds
- Sheltered muddy gravels
- Peat and clay exposures
- Subtidal chalk
- Tide-swept channels
- Fragile sponge & anthozoan communities on subtidal rocky habitats
- Estuarine rocky habitats
- Seamount communities
- Carbonate mounds
- Cold-water coral reefs
- Deep-sea sponge communities
- Sabellaria spinulosa reefs
- Subtidal sands and gravels
- Horse mussel beds
- Mud habitats in deep water
- File shell beds
- Maerl beds
- Serpulid reefs
- Blue mussel beds
- Saline lagoons

=== Priority Species ===
A list of UK BAP priority species can be viewed here.

== Regional response ==
The regional response to guidelines published in 1995 led to 162 Local Biodiversity Action Plans (LBAPs) being produced for England, Wales and Scotland, with further action plans later produced for Northern Ireland. These were usually formulated by a broad partnership of conservation organisations working on county and similar-sized areas of Britain. LBAPs play an important role in translating national and sub-national strategies, priorities and targets into direct local action on the ground, and in identifying which UK priority species and habitats are found in that local area.

== See also ==
- List of United Kingdom Biodiversity Action Plan species
- List of species and habitats of principal importance in England
- List of habitats of principal importance in Wales
- Endangered Species Recovery Plan (United States)
