= George Parker =

George Parker may refer to:

- George Parker (astrologer) (1654–1743), English almanac maker
- Sir George Parker, 2nd Baronet (c. 1673–1727), English politician, MP
- George Parker (Royal Navy officer) (1767–1847), Royal Navy admiral
- George C. Parker (1860–1936), American fraudster
- George Parker (cricketer) (1899–1969), South African cricketer
- George Parker, 2nd Earl of Macclesfield (c. 1695–1764), astronomer
- George Parker, 4th Earl of Macclesfield (1755–1842), British peer and politician
- George Parker, 7th Earl of Macclesfield (1888–1975), British peer and landowner
- George Parker, 8th Earl of Macclesfield (1914–1992), British peer and landowner
- George Parker (race walker) (1897–1974), Australian athlete
- George Parker (MP) (1619–1673), English landowner and politician who sat in the House of Commons in 1659 and 1660
- George D. Parker (1873–1937), American-born actor, writer and director
- George Howard Parker (1864–1955), American zoologist
- George Parker (New Zealand politician) (1839–1915), New Zealand politician
- George Swinnerton Parker (1866–1952), founder of Parker Brothers
- George Safford Parker (1863–1937), American inventor and industrialist
- George Wells Parker (1882–1931), African American political activist
- George M. Parker (United States Army officer) (1889–1968), major general of the United States Army
- George Parker (footballer) (1921–2002), Australian rules footballer
- George G. C. Parker, American economist
- George Parker (squash player) (born 1996), English squash player
- George P. Parker (1885–1937), attorney general of Utah
- George Lane Parker (1724–1791), British Army officer and politician

== See also ==
- Georgie Parker (born 1964), Australian actress
- Georgie Parker (field hockey) (born 1989), Australian field hockey player
- George Parker Bidder (1806–1878), English engineer and calculating prodigy
- George Parker Bidder III (1863–1954), British marine biologist
- George Parker Bidder Jr. (1836–1896), British barrister
- George Parker Winship (1871–1952), American librarian and author
