= Bidder (surname) =

Bidder is a surname. It may refer to:

- Anna McClean Bidder (1903–2001), British zoologist
- Birgit Bidder (born 1986), Swedish musician
- Friedrich Bidder (1810–1894), German physiologist and anatomist
- George Parker Bidder (marine biologist) (1863–1954), British marine biologist
- George Parker Bidder (engineer) (1806–1878), British engineer
- George Parker Bidder Jr. (1836–1896), British lawyer
- Joyce Bidder (1906–1999), British sculptor
- Marion Bidder (1862–1932), British physiologist
