= Alvin J. Siteman Cancer Center =

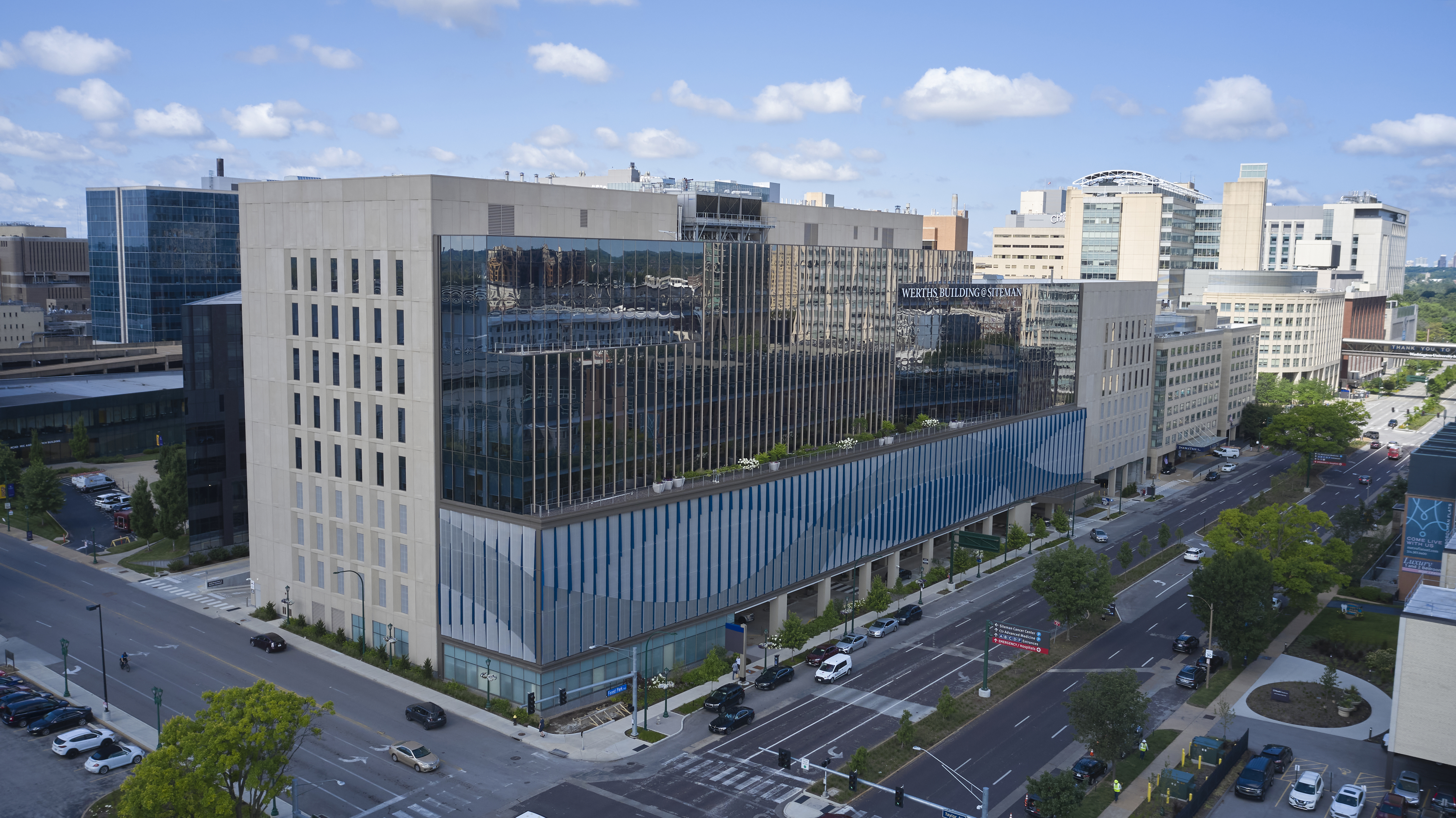
- Gary C. Werths Building at Siteman Cancer Center

Geography
- Location: St. Louis, Missouri, United States
- Coordinates: 38.6380855°N 90.2603994°W

Organization
- Type: Specialist
- Affiliated university: Barnes-Jewish Hospital, Washington University School of Medicine

Services
- Speciality: Cancer

History
- Founded: 1999; 27 years ago

Links
- Website: www.siteman.wustl.edu
- Lists: Hospitals in Missouri

The Alvin J. Siteman Cancer Center at Barnes-Jewish Hospital and Washington University School of Medicine is a cancer treatment, research and education institution in the St. Louis area. Siteman is the only cancer center in Missouri and within 240 miles of St. Louis to be designated a Comprehensive Cancer Center by the National Cancer Institute (NCI). Siteman is also the only area member of the National Comprehensive Cancer Network, a nonprofit alliance of 33 cancer centers dedicated to improving the quality and effectiveness of cancer care.

Siteman treats adults at six locations and partners with St. Louis Children's Hospital in the treatment of pediatric patients at Siteman Kids at St. Louis Children's Hospital.

Siteman treats more than 75,000 individual patients, including 12,000 newly diagnosed patients, every year, placing Siteman among the top five cancer centers nationally for patient volume.

== Locations ==
Siteman's main location is at the Washington University Medical Center in St. Louis, where the Gary C. Werths Building opened in 2024.

Five other St. Louis-area sites offer specialized cancer care for adults in suburban locations:

- Barnes-Jewish West County Hospital in Creve Coeur, Missouri
- Barnes-Jewish St. Peters Hospital in St. Peters, Missouri
- Northwest HealthCare in Florissant, Missouri, part of Christian Hospital
- Siteman Cancer Center-South County in south St. Louis County, Missouri
- Memorial Hospital Shiloh in Shiloh, Illinois

Pediatric patients are treated at St. Louis Children's Hospital, also located at the Washington University Medical Center.

== History and leadership ==
In 1999, Alvin J. and Ruth Siteman committed $35 million to the development of the Siteman Cancer Center at Washington University School of Medicine and Barnes-Jewish Hospital. The commitment was the largest gift ever received by Barnes-Jewish and Washington University in St. Louis in support of cancer research, patient care and services, education and community outreach.

Timothy Eberlein has been director of the center since its inception. Daniel Link is deputy director.

In 2001, the NCI designated Siteman as a Cancer Center, which signaled that the institution had demonstrated significant scope and quality in its cancer research programs. The designation came with $850,000 per year in federal research grants. The NCI named Siteman a Comprehensive Cancer Center in 2005, recognizing its broad-based research, outreach and education activities, and awarded the center a five-year, $21 million support grant. The NCI renewed the designation in 2010 and awarded another five-year grant, totaling $23 million. The grants fund programs and specialized services that promote multidisciplinary research, as well as shared scientific resources and seed awards that enable investigators to develop and pursue new research opportunities. Additional renewals were awarded in 2015 and 2020. In 2023, the NCI awarded Siteman a merit extension, funding the cancer center until 2027 without having to undergo a complete review of its programs.

In 2010, Alvin J. Siteman announced he would donate $1 million annually to an endowment fund at the center to advance cancer prevention, diagnosis and treatment programs that might not receive federal funding.

== Research ==
Scientists and physicians affiliated with Siteman hold more than $185 million in cancer research and related training grants, including $66 million from the NCI. The results of basic laboratory research are rapidly incorporated into treatment advances. This process is enhanced by patient access to more than 500 therapeutic clinical studies, including many collaborative efforts with other leading cancer centers throughout the country.

In 2013, three scientists affiliated with Siteman, Washington University School of Medicine and the McDonnell Genome Institute were included on the Thomson Reuters list of “Hottest Scientific Researchers of 2012”: Richard K. Wilson, Elaine Mardis, and Li Ding. The list recognized the 21 most-cited researchers of 2012. Robert Fulton, a fourth scientist from Washington University School of Medicine and the McDonnell Genome Institute, also made the list.

=== Research advances ===
Researchers affiliated with Siteman and/or Washington University School of Medicine have pioneered important advances in cancer research, prevention, education and treatment. Highlights and ongoing studies include these projects:

2025 — AI-based breast cancer risk technology

- A new technology that harnesses artificial intelligence (AI) to analyze mammograms and improve the accuracy of predicting a woman's personalized five-year risk of developing breast cancer received Breakthrough Designation from the Food and Drug Administration (FDA).

2024 — Breast cancer vaccine and young-onset cancer

- A small clinical trial shows promising results for patients with triple-negative breast cancer who received an investigational vaccine designed to prevent recurrence of tumors. The trial is the first to report results for this type of vaccine — known as a neoantigen DNA vaccine — for breast cancer patients.
- A study of nearly 150,000 adults finds that people born after 1965 are aging faster at the cellular level than those born from 1950 to 1954, raising their risk of cancer by 17%. The findings suggest accelerated biological aging may help explain rising cancer rates among younger generations.

2023 — New test for blood cancers and technology for brain biopsies

- Developed at Washington University, a new test for acute myeloid leukemia (AML) and myelodysplastic syndrome (MDS) becomes the first whole-genome sequencing test for cancer to be approved for reimbursement by the Centers for Medicare & Medicaid Services (CMS). The test provides information that physicians can use to help determine an individual patient's treatment.
- The FDA grants Breakthrough Device status to NeuroAccess, a noninvasive tool for blood-based brain tumor biopsies. Developed with Washington University technology, the device uses sonobiopsy to open the blood-brain barrier for molecular analysis. Researchers say it could revolutionize brain diagnostics and expand disease detection beyond tumors.

2021 — Whole genome sequencing for blood cancers and new hope for lung cancer

- For certain blood cancers, such as acute myeloid leukemia (AML) and myelodysplastic syndrome (MDS), deciding whether patients need an aggressive treatment typically hinges on a set of lab tests to identify genetic changes. Some of these tests rely on 60-year-old technology. In a new study, researchers show that whole genome sequencing is at least as accurate and often better than conventional genetic tests that help determine the treatment for a patient's blood cancer.
- In a global study led in part by Washington University researchers, it's discovered that sotorasib reduces tumor size and shows promise in improving survival among patients with lung tumors caused by a specific DNA mutation.

2020 — New roadmap for endometrial cancer

- In search of more effective therapies for endometrial cancer, Washington University researchers discover dozens of molecular changes that offer insight into how physicians might better identify which patients will need aggressive treatment and why a common treatment is not effective for some.

2019 — Improving brain cancer survival

- Researchers identified distinct molecular signatures of glioblastoma in men and women that help explain why more males get this type of brain cancer and generally have lower survival rates than females. The findings suggest that tailoring treatments to men and women with glioblastoma based on the molecular subtypes of their tumors may improve survival for all patients.

2018 — Personalized brain cancer vaccines

- In a clinical trial to test the effectiveness of a glioblastoma vaccine, some patients "lived significantly longer" - up to seven years longer - than most people who are diagnosed with the brain cancer. Researchers developed personalized vaccines for each patient, removing as much of the brain tumor as possible, then combining pieces of the tumor with cells from the patient's immune system. This "trains" the immune cells to attack tumor cells.

2017 — CAR-T cell therapy and using Zika virus to fight brain cancer

- In a clinical trial at Siteman, at least 16 of 20 people who received a new treatment called CAR-T cell therapy saw their cancers disappear after treatment. The patients had previously failed standard therapies. The therapy, Axicabtagene ciloleucel, received FDA approval on Oct. 18, 2017.
- While Zika virus causes devastating damage to the brains of developing fetuses, it one day may be an effective treatment for glioblastoma, a deadly form of brain cancer. Joint research from Washington University School of Medicine and UC San Diego School of Medicine shows that the virus kills brain cancer stem cells, the kind of cells most resistant to standard treatments.

2016 — Chemotherapy for brain tumors

- Neurosurgeons using lasers to treat brain cancer discover that the technique breaks down the blood-brain barrier for about four weeks, allowing them to use chemotherapy to treat the tumor. A clinical trial is still ongoing, but Eric C. Leuthardt, M.D., considers the initial results promising.

2015 — Melanoma vaccine and urine test for kidney cancer

- In a proof of concept study, a research team led by Beatriz Carreno, Ph.D., shows that personalized medicine can "wake up" the immune systems of melanoma patients. Further study needs to be done to see if the customized vaccines can prevent recurrence in patients with advanced melanoma.
- A urine-based screening test is found to be more than 95 percent accurate in identifying early-stage kidney cancer, according to a study led by Evan Kharasch.

2014 — Breast cancer vaccine and cancer goggles

- A breast cancer vaccine developed by William Gillanders is shown to activate the immune system to fight tumor cells and slow down cancer progression. The vaccine, which targets mammaglobin-A, a protein expressed in breast tumors, involved very few side effects.
- High-tech goggles developed by Samuel Achilefu help surgeons see cancer cells in real time. The technology, which includes a digital display, infrared light and use of an intravenous dye, could negate the need for follow-up surgeries due to undetected cancer cells.

2013 — Endometrial cancer and leukemia

- In separate studies, researchers at Washington University School of Medicine and the McDonnell Genome Institute help identify major genetic mutations that promote endometrial cancer and acute myeloid leukemia. The research, part of The Cancer Genome Atlas project, provides new information that could change treatments for patients and aid drug development.

2012 — Leukemia, breast cancer research and cancer prevention

- Siteman leukemia doctor Lukas Wartman who was diagnosed with the disease himself, goes into remission for an unprecedented third time after Timothy Ley and his colleagues at the McDonnell Genome Institute sequenced Wartman's cancerous and normal genes. Researchers also analyzed his RNA. By doing so, his treatment team, which includes John DiPersio deputy director of Siteman, discovered that a normal gene might be contributing to the growth of Wartman's cancer by producing mass amounts of a certain protein. They found that a drug used to treat a type of kidney cancer was able to inhibit the gene.
- Scientists including Matthew Ellis use whole genome sequencing to compare differences between the DNA of breast cancer tumors and healthy cells in 46 women. While revealing the complexity of the disease, the analysis suggests routes to personalized medicine that may have a greater probability of healing patients.
- Building on his research for the Nurses Health Study and Growing Up Today Study, Graham Colditz continues to examine links between cancer and alcohol use, diet, exercise and other factors and what individuals and communities can do to reduce disease risk. In a 2012 paper, Colditz argues that half of all cancer cases can be prevented, thereby saving more than 280,000 people in 2011, and that individuals, medical and health experts, government officials and others must start taking already known steps to reduce cancer's impact.

2011 — Blood-related cancers

- Siteman completes its 5,000th hematopoietic stem cell transplantation, a common therapy for patients with blood-related cancers such as leukemia, lymphoma, and multiple myeloma or another blood-related cancer.

2010 — Pediatric cancers

- Washington University School of Medicine and St. Jude Children's Research Hospital announce their joint Pediatric Cancer Genome Project to identify the genetic changes that give rise to some of the world's deadliest childhood cancers. The team plans to decode the genomes of more than 600 childhood cancer patients who have contributed tumor samples.

2008 — Genetic sequencing

- For the first time, scientists decode all the genes of a cancer patient and find a suite of mutations that might have caused the disease or aided its progression. Timothy Ley, Elaine Mardis, Richard K. Wilson, and their colleagues at McDonnell Genome Institute say the finding could lead to new therapies and could help doctors make better choices among existing treatments, based on a more detailed genetic picture of each patient's cancer. Though the research involved acute myelogenous leukemia (AML), the same techniques can also be used to study other cancers.

2007 — Nanotechnology and radiation therapy

- Gregory Lanza, Samuel Wickline, and researchers in their labs announce the development of nanoparticles, significantly smaller than the width of a human hair, aimed at attacking cancer by locating and "latching on" to tumors. Used in conjunction with magnetic resonance imaging, the nanoparticles could help physicians monitor cancerous tissue and deliver medicine directly to the tumor, not to the rest of the body.
- Researchers led by Daniel Low and Parag Parikh develop a machine called the 4D Phantom that follows a patient's complex breathing pattern to deliver radiation therapy to tumors that move, such as those in the lung.

2006 — Photoacoustic imaging

- Lihong Wang announces his work on photoacoustic imaging, a new technique that uses light and sound to create detailed, color pictures of tumors and organs. The noninvasive imaging technique, which can be performed without the dangers of radiation exposure associated with X-ray and CT scans, also may help doctors detect cancer earlier than ever before, its developers say.

2003 — Breast cancer

- Thalachallour Mohanakumar and other researchers at Siteman develop and test on mice a prototype vaccine that causes cancerous tumors to stop growing, then to shrink. The vaccine, which is being developed to fight breast cancer in humans, helps the immune system target a protein found in 80 percent of breast tumors.

2001 — Imaging and the immune system's role in controlling cancer

- Research led by Joanne Mortimer shows that positron emission tomography (PET) scans can often identify within two weeks which women with advanced breast cancer are likely to respond to hormone therapy, a gentler alternative to chemotherapy that is usually just as effective.
- Robert D. Schreiber and colleagues publish the first evidence that the immune system plays a role in controlling cancer, a process called immunosurveillance. In 2007, they find in mice that some cancers are kept in a state of "equilibrium," which leads them to suggest that one day immunotherapy may convert cancer into a chronic but controllable disease.
- Molecular oncologist Howard McLeod announces research on a genetic mutation that affects how well patients will respond to chemotherapy. The findings may make possible a blood test that would determine what dose, or even which drugs, would be most effective for each patient.

1998 — Biopsies

- Ralph G. Dacey Jr. performs the world's first magnetic stereotactic surgery to biopsy a human brain tumor using an indirect route to the tumor. The route is designed to avoid regions that would normally be entered when a surgeon manually inserts a surgical tool straight at a site. The investigational computerized system allows surgeons to carefully manipulate surgical tools inside the brain through the use of a catheter driven by precisely controlled magnetic fields.

1994 — Genetic screening test for thyroid cancer

- Led in part by Helen Donis-Keller, researchers for the first time develop genetic screening tests that detect a rare, lethal form of thyroid cancer in the preclinical state, permitting early treatment in children predisposed to the disease. It was the first surgical prevention of cancer based on genetic test results.

1979 — Bone marrow transplants

- As part of a clinical trial, leukemia patients at Washington University in St. Louis and four other medical centers receive transplants of their healthy bone marrow cells to determine how effective the procedure is in conjunction with chemotherapy and radiation treatment. The new technique would later be called autologous hematopoietic stem cell transplantation.

Mid-1970s — Imaging

- Michel Ter-Pogossian leads the research that will turn the PET scanner from an intriguing concept to a medical imaging technique used by hospitals and laboratories everywhere to scan the working brain.

1954 — Growth factors and cancer

- Rita Levi-Montalcini and Stanley Cohen isolate for the first time nerve growth factor, a potent substance that promotes nerve cell growth. The discovery later leads to insights into cancer and birth defects, and in 1986 the two are awarded a Nobel Prize for their work.

1946 — Radiocarbon in cancer research

- For the first time, the United States Department of War releases carbon-14 isotopes to a civilian entity, Siteman's predecessor institutions, Barnard Free Skin and Cancer Hospital (founded in 1905) and the Mallinckrodt Institute of Radiology (founded in 1923), where they are used in cancer studies.

1941 — Cyclotron

- At the Mallinckrodt Institute of Radiology, construction begins on the first cyclotron devoted to medical and biological research.

1933 — Lung cancer surgery and the disease's link to smoking

- Evarts Ambrose Graham becomes the first surgeon to cure a human case of lung cancer by removing an entire lung during a procedure known as pneumonectomy. In 1950, he and Ernst Wynder publish the results of the first large-scale research on smoking, linking prolonged cigarette use to lung cancer.

== Education and community outreach ==
In addition to treatment and research programs, Siteman is involved with community outreach, education and screening. Efforts include:

- The Program for the Elimination of Cancer Disparities (PECaD), which develops cancer prevention and awareness messages, reports research findings to the community, hosts continuing medical education events and engages in other activities.
- Placing information about breast cancer and mammograms in Laundromats, where a study has shown it's more likely to be seen than in other community settings by women who lack access to adequate health care.
- A mobile mammography van that offers screenings by appointment in St. Louis and surrounding communities.
- A community health van that brings cancer screenings directly to residents of St. Louis and 82 counties in Missouri and Illinois.

== Siteman Cancer Network ==
In 2017, Siteman Cancer Center launched the Siteman Cancer Network, an affiliation with regional medical centers that is aimed at improving the health of individuals and communities through cancer research, treatment and prevention. Network members are Phelps Health's Delbert Day Cancer Institute in Rolla, Missouri, Alton Memorial Hospital in Alton, Illinois, and Southern Illinois Healthcare in Carbondale, Illinois.
