= Richard K. Wilson =

- Born: March 23, 1959 (age 67)
- Education: Miami University; University of Oklahoma
- Scientific career
- Workplaces: Institute for Genomic Medicine; Nationwide Children's Hospital; Ohio State University; Washington University in St. Louis

Richard K. Wilson (born March 23, 1959) is a molecular geneticist. He is the founding Executive Director of the Institute for Genomic Medicine at Nationwide Children’s Hospital and Professor of Pediatrics at the Ohio State University College of Medicine.

He received his A.B. degree (Microbiology) from Miami University in 1981, his Ph.D. (Chemistry) from the University of Oklahoma in 1986, and was a Research Fellow in the Division of Biology at the California Institute of Technology (1986-1990).

In 1990, Wilson joined the faculty of Washington University School of Medicine where he co-founded the Genome Sequencing Center/McDonnell Genome Institute. At Washington University, Wilson was the Alan A. and Edith L. Wolff Distinguished Professor of Medicine, Professor of Genetics, Professor of Molecular Microbiology, and a member of the Senior Leadership Committee of the Siteman Cancer Center. Wilson’s laboratories have been among the world’s leaders in genome analysis. His teams have sequenced and analyzed billions of bases of DNA from the genomes of bacteria, yeast, plants, invertebrates, vertebrates, primates and humans. Wilson and his colleagues at Washington University sequenced the first animal genome – that of the roundworm Caenorhabditis elegans – and contributed substantially to the sequencing and analysis of the human genome. Following the Human Genome Project, they also sequenced the genomes of the mouse, chimpanzee, orangutan, gorilla, rhesus macaque, platypus, the plants Arabidopsis thaliana and Zea mays (corn), as well as various invertebrates, insect vectors and microorganisms. His team was the first to sequence the genome of a cancer patient and discover genetic signatures relevant to the pathogenesis of the disease. Building upon these achievements, Wilson and his colleagues helped initiate and participated in several landmark genomics projects including The Cancer Genome Atlas, the Pediatric Cancer Genome Project, the Genome Reference Consortium, the Human Microbiome Project, and the Centers for Common Disease Genomics. He is the most cited author of Nature.

In 2008, Dr. Wilson was elected as a Fellow of the American Association for the Advancement of Science (2008). In 2011, he received the Distinguished Achievement Award from Miami University and the Distinguished Alumnus Award from the University of Oklahoma College of Arts and Sciences.

In 2016, Dr. Wilson and several colleagues moved to Nationwide Children’s Hospital and launched the Institute for Genomic Medicine. Their mission is to utilize cutting-edge genome sequencing and analysis technology to discover clues that will lead to more effective diagnosis and treatment of cancer and other human diseases in children and adults.
