= Journal of Cell Science =

- Discipline: Cell biology
- Language: English
- Edited by: Michael Way

Publication details
- Former name: Quarterly Journal of Microscopical Science
- History: 1853–present
- Publisher: The Company of Biologists (United Kingdom)
- Frequency: Semi-monthly
- Open access: Hybrid; Delayed, after 12 months
- Impact factor: 3.6 (2024)

Standard abbreviations
- ISO 4: J. Cell Sci.

Indexing
- CODEN: JNCSAI
- ISSN: 0021-9533 (print); 1477-9137 (web)
- LCCN: 66009876
- OCLC no.: 1754489

Links
- Journal homepage; Journal publisher; Online issue archive

The Journal of Cell Science (formerly the Quarterly Journal of Microscopical Science) is a semi-monthly peer-reviewed scientific journal in the field of cell biology. The journal is published by The Company of Biologists. The journal is part of the Review Commons initiative, is integrated with bioRxiv for co-submission and is partnered with the Web of Science Reviewer Recognition Service (previously Publons). Journal of Cell Science is a hybrid journal and publishes 24 issues a year. Content over 12 months old is free to read.

== History ==
=== Foundation and early years ===
The journal was established in 1853 as the Quarterly Journal of Microscopical Science (Q. J. Microsc. Sci., ISSN 0370-2952). The founding editors were Edwin Lankester and George Busk. The publisher of the early issues was Samuel Highley of Fleet Street, London, with John Churchill and Sons (later J. & A. Churchill) taking over from 1856. The journal's original aims, as described in a preface to the first issue, were not limited to biology, but encompassed all branches of science related to the microscope:

Recent improvements in the Microscope having rendered that instrument increasingly available for scientific research, and having created a large class of observers who devote themselves to whatever department of science may be investigated by its aid, it has been thought that the time is come when a Journal devoted entirely to objects connected with the use of the Microscope would contribute to the advancement of science, and secure the co-operation of all interested in its various applications.

The object of this Journal will be the diffusion of information relating to all improvements in the construction of the Microscope, and to record the most recent and important researches made by its aid in different departments of science, whether in this country or on the continent. ...

It will undoubtedly be a Journal of Microscopy and Histology; but the first is a term but recently introduced into our language, and the last would give but a contracted view of the objects to which the Journal will be devoted.

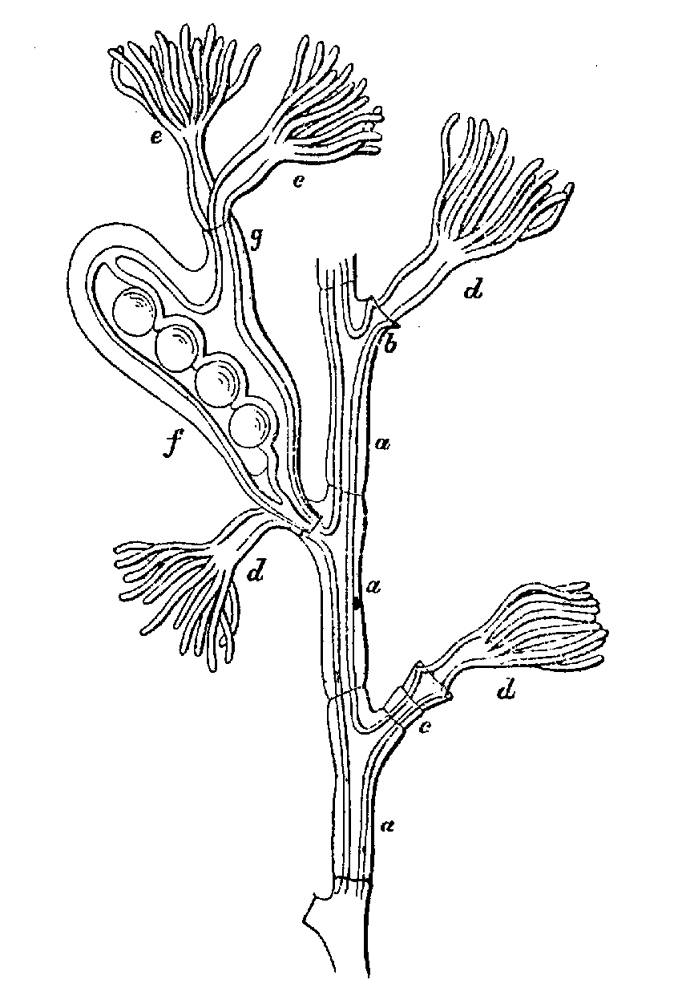
Figure showing part of the female colony of Halecium beanii, from an 1873 article by George James Allman

Contributors to the first issue include Thomas Henry Huxley, Joseph Lister, William Crawford Williamson, and George Shadbolt. The contents of the early issues are diverse, and include original research articles, translations of papers published in other languages, transactions of the meetings of the Microscopical Society of London (later the Royal Microscopical Society), and book reviews. The journal also published short notes and memoranda, aimed "to gather up fragments of information, which singly might appear to be useless but together are of great importance to science"; the editors encouraged non-specialist submissions to this section, considering that "there are few possessors of a Microscope who have not met with some stray fact or facts which, published in this way, may not lead to important results." The editors also intended "to relieve the graver and more strictly scientific matter of the Journal by lighter contributions, such as will be found useful to the beginner, not uninteresting to the advanced observer, and of interest perhaps to the general reader."

Lankester and Busk co-edited the journal until the end of 1868. Lankester continued to edit the journal with his son, Ray Lankester until the end of 1871.

=== Under Ray Lankester and Edwin Goodrich ===
After Edwin Lankester's retirement, Ray Lankester remained an editor, with co-editors including E. Klein, William Archer, Joseph Frank Payne, and W. T. Thiselton Dyer. From 1878 until 1920, he served as the sole editor, amassing a total of over fifty years as an editor of the journal. The journal flourished under his guidance, becoming one of the leading British science journals. His successor, Edwin Stephen Goodrich, served as editor for twenty-five years, from 1920 until his death in 1946. Oxford University Press took over as publishers in 1920.

=== The Company of Biologists and relaunch ===
Q J Microsc Sci cover with Company of Biologists

In 1946 or 1947, George Parker Bidder, then the owner, gave the journal to The Company of Biologists, a company he had founded in 1925 in a successful bid to rescue the failing British Journal of Experimental Biology. Initially, Oxford University Press remained the publishers on behalf of the Company of Biologists, but production was later transferred to Cambridge University Press. In 1952, The Company of Biologists became a registered charity, and full editorial control passed to the journal's editor-in-chief.

From 1946, the journal was edited jointly by Carl Pantin, an experimental zoologist and physiologist, and John Baker, a cytologist. Under the latter's influence, the journal accepted a growing number of papers in the relatively new discipline of cytology, now usually termed cell biology. After Pantin's retirement in 1960, the scope of the journal was refocused on the field of cytology, which the editors defined as "Everything that relates directly to the structure, chemical composition, physical nature, and functions of animal and plant cells, or to the techniques that are used in cytological investigations". Subsequent editors include H. G. Callan and A. V. Grimstone.

In 1966, the journal was redesigned and relaunched under the new title Journal of Cell Science, reflecting its altered scope. It continued to be published broadly quarterly until 1969, when the frequency increased to between six and nine issues per year. In the mid-to-late 1980s, to reduce publication lead times and compete more effectively with Cell (which had been launched in 1974), The Company of Biologists moved away from Cambridge University Press and set up its own in-house typesetting and printing for its journals, by then three in number, becoming pioneers in using disks from authors. Publication frequency also increased, at first to ten issues in 1987, then monthly between 1988 and 1995, finally becoming fortnightly in December 1996.

Issues from 1853 are available online via the journal website and HighWire Press as PDFs, with a text version additionally available from 2000. Content over 12 months old is freely available, and all articles are available to readers in developing countries via the Health InterNetwork Access to Research Initiative. Since 2004, authors have retained copyright of their material, licensing their contributions to the journal.

== Scope and content ==
Journal of Cell Science publishes original research articles and reports, techniques and resources, reviews, and primers across the full range of topics in cell biology.

In addition to research papers and reviews, Journal of Cell Science includes critical commentaries and an occasional column, "Sticky Wickets", offering "controversial views of life-science research".

When appropriate, some articles are grouped into subject collections. Collection topics covered include:

- Adhesion
- Autophagy
- Cell biology and disease
- Cilia and flagella
- Collective cell migration
- ESCRT machinery
- Establishing polarity
- Exploring the nucleus
- Imaging
- Invadopodia and podosomes
- Mechanotransduction
- Microtubule dynamics
- Mitochondria
- Stem cells
- Tools in cell biology
- Ubiquitin

The journal operates on a continuous publication model. The final version of record is released online as soon as it is ready.

== Abstracting and indexing ==
Journal of Cell Science is abstracted and/or indexed by:

- BIOBASE
- CAM abstracts
- Cambridge Scientific Abstracts
- Current Content
- EMBASE
- Clarivate Web of Science
- Medline
- Scopus

Journal of Cell Science is a signatory of the San Francisco Declaration on Research Assessment (DORA).

== Journal management ==
Michael Way (Francis Crick Institute, UK) has been the editor-in-chief since 2012, when he took over from Fiona Watt.
