= Martin McMahon =

Martin McMahon may refer to:

- Martin T. McMahon (1838–1906), American jurist, Union Army officer and Medal of Honor recipient
- Martin McMahon (biologist), Scottish cancer biologist
