= Joshua Brickman =

American / British biologist

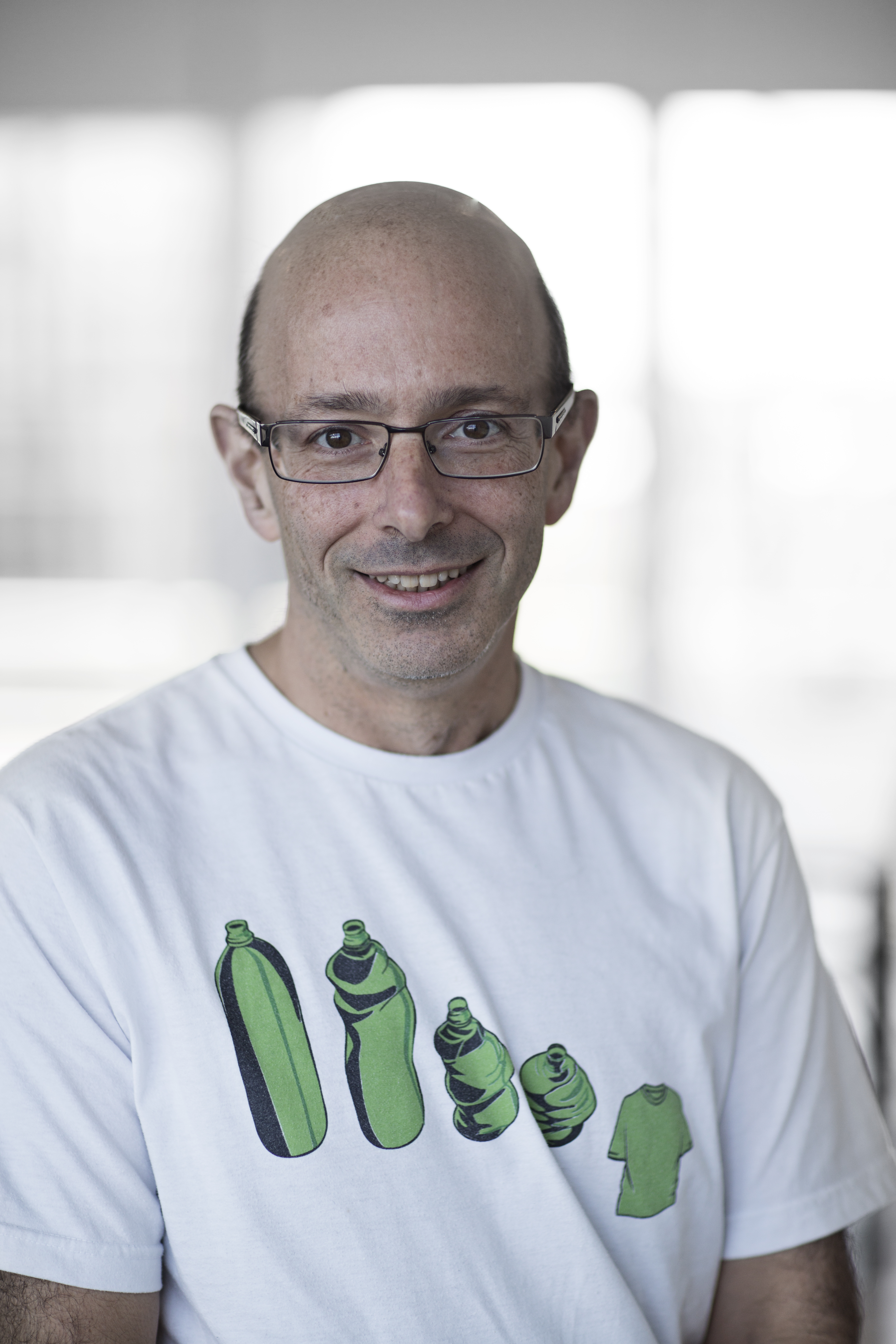
Joshua Brickman

Joshua Mark Brickman is an American/British biologist. He is a professor of stem cell and developmental biology at the University of Copenhagen.

Brickman received a Bachelor of Arts degree in Chemistry and Philosophy from the University of Vermont in 1985 and a PhD in Molecular Cellular Biology from Harvard University in 1996 (Supervisor: Professor Mark Ptashne.)

== Research profile ==
Brickman's research is focused on early embryonic stem cell lineage specification, and the mechanisms involved in transcriptional plasticity of differentiation processes.

== Most cited papers ==
- Dattani MT, Martinez-Barbera JP, Thomas PQ, Brickman JM, Gupta R, Mårtensson IL, Toresson H, Fox M, Wales JK, Hindmarsh PC, Krauss S. Mutations in the homeobox gene HESX1/Hesx1 associated with septo-optic dysplasia in human and mouse. Nature Genetics. 1998 Jun;19(2):125-33 According to Google Scholar, it has been cited 824 times.
- Thomas PQ, Dattani MT, Brickman JM, McNay D, Warne G, Zacharin M, Cameron F, Hurst J, Woods K, Dunger D, Stanhope R. Heterozygous HESX1 mutations associated with isolated congenital pituitary hypoplasia and septo-optic dysplasia. Human molecular genetics. 2001 Jan 1;10(1):39-45. According to Google Scholar, this article has been cited 319 times
- Canham MA, Sharov AA, Ko MS, Brickman JM. Functional heterogeneity of embryonic stem cells revealed through translational amplification of an early endodermal transcript. PLoS Biol. 2010 May 25;8(5):e1000379.According to Google Scholar, this article has been cited 242 times
- Weinert BT, Narita T, Satpathy S, Srinivasan B, Hansen BK, Schölz C, Hamilton WB, Zucconi BE, Wang WW, Liu WR, Brickman JM. Time-resolved analysis reveals rapid dynamics and broad scope of the CBP/p300 acetylome. Cell. 2018 Jun 28;174(1):231-44. According to Google Scholar, this article has been cited 122 times
- Morgani SM, Canham MA, Nichols J, Sharov AA, Migueles RP, Ko MS, Brickman JM. Totipotent embryonic stem cells arise in ground-state culture conditions. Cell Reports. 2013 Jun 27;3(6):1945-57. According to Google Scholar, this article has been cited 197times
- Morrison GM, Brickman JM. Conserved roles for Oct4 homologues in maintaining multipotency during early vertebrate development. Development. 2006 May 15;133(10):2011-22. According to Google Scholar, this article has been cited 175 times
- Roberts C, Sutherland HF, Farmer H, Kimber W, Halford S, Carey A, Brickman JM, Wynshaw-Boris A, Scambler PJ. Targeted mutagenesis of the Hira gene results in gastrulation defects and patterning abnormalities of mesoendodermal derivatives prior to early embryonic lethality. Molecular and Cellular Biology. 2002 Apr 1;22(7):2318-28. According to Google Scholar, this article has been cited 152 times
