= Cytosis (board game) =

Worker placement board game based on cell biology

A Cell Biology Game
- Designers: John Coveyou
- Illustrators: Tomasz Bogusz
- Publishers: Genius Games
- Publication: 2017; 9 years ago
- Players: 2–5
- Playing time: 60–90 minutes
- Age range: 10+
- Website: www.geniusgames.org/collections/biology/products/cytosis-a-cell-biology-game-a-science-accurate-strategy-board-game-about-building-proteins-carbohydrates-enzymes-organelles-membranes

Cytosis is a cell biology worker placement board game designed by John Coveyou and published in 2017 by Genius Games. The game's development was funded via a crowdfunding campaign on Kickstarter.

== Gameplay ==
The objective of the game is to ensure the health of a human cell by managing its operations. The board represents a cell in which are located various organelles that are sites of player actions. Around the edge of the board is a scoring track. There are coloured cubes representing various macromolecules within the cell: carbohydrates (green), lipids (yellow), messenger RNA (mRNA, black), and proteins (red). The sets of cards are split into Cell Component cards, Event cards, and Goal cards.

The cards are separated by type and shuffled, then four Cell Component cards are placed on the appropriate area of the game board, three to five randomly selected Goal cards are placed at the top of the game board, and players place one of their tokens at the zero space of the scoring track. The starting player receives two adenosine triphosphate (ATP) tokens, and each subsequent player one more ATP token than the player preceding them. Each player also selects to keep one of the three Cell Component cards that were dealt to them, shuffling the others into the draw pile.

Each turn, a player places their flask token on a chosen organelle and executes the prescribed action. These actions enable the player to collect resources such as carbohydrates or ATP, or to acquire Cell Component cards. This requires multiple steps and multiple turns to simulate the process of protein synthesis.

Players acquire health points by completing the actions listed on Cell Component cards, such as assembling enzymes and hormones or hormone receptors. These are then deployed to defend the cell from viral infection. Health points are the game's victory points.

== Expansion ==
The Virus expansion set includes additional Cell Component, Event, and Goal cards, and also includes pink antibody cubes, dice, and player mats.

== Reception ==
The game has been endorsed by the Journal of Cell Science.

Alex Rosenwald, in a review for Board Game Quest, stated that the concept of protein synthesis "shines through in all facets of gameplay", with the game mechanics and organelle cell functions aligning into an "immersive experience of creating and transporting various chemicals in and out of the cells". He also stated that the game's basis in science is "hit-or-miss" amongst players, with "no real grey area for ambivalence".

In a review for Meeple Mountain, David McMillan stated the gameplay distracts players from the background educational aspect of the game, and that it "performs brilliantly" in terms of both appeal and engagement.
