= Hayaatun Sillem =

UK Engineer

Dame Hayaatun Sillem DBE FIET HonFREng
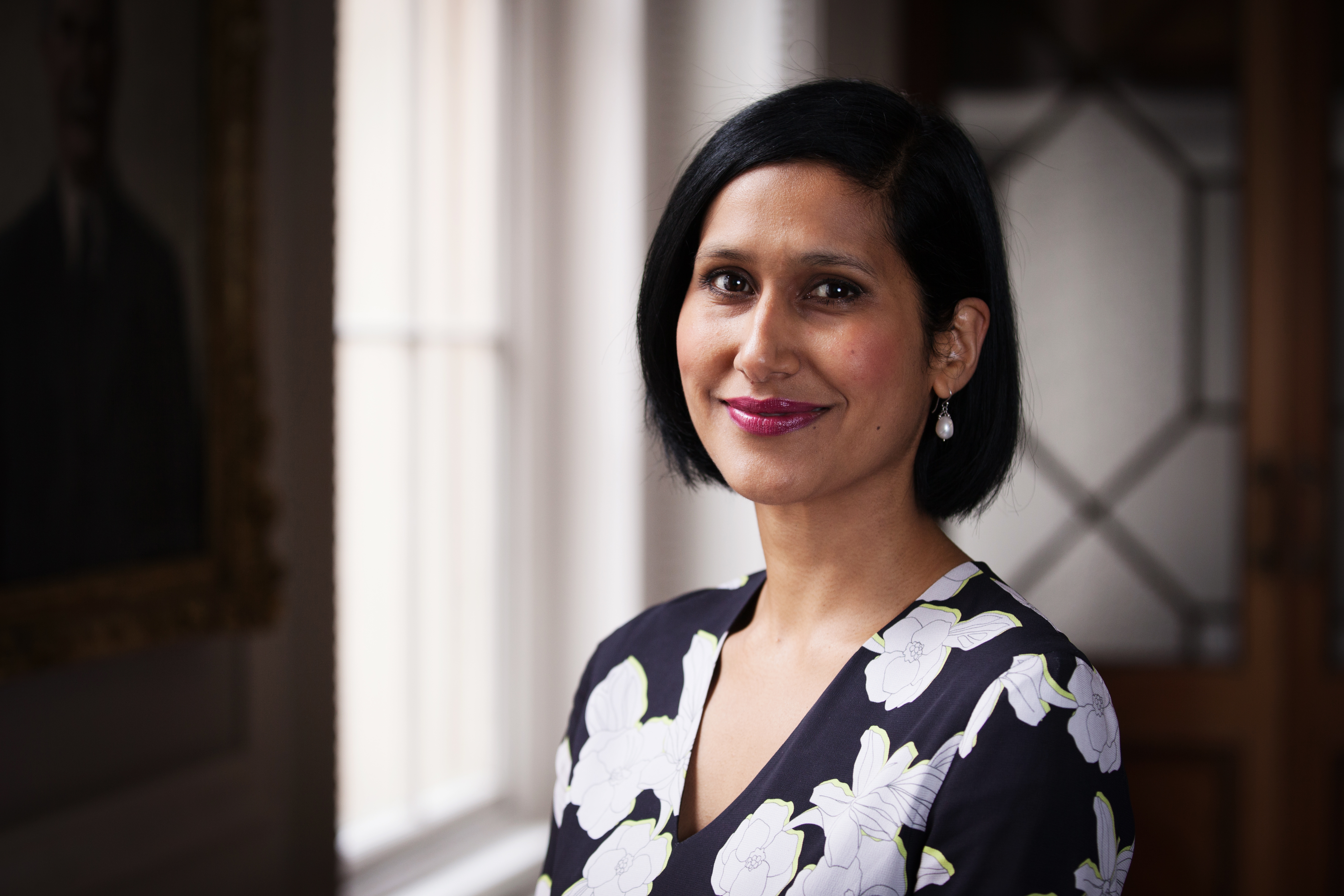
- Hayaatun Sillem, chief executive of the Royal Academy of Engineering, UK
- Born: Hayaatun Is'harc
- Education: Godolphin and Latymer School
- Alma mater: Oxford University (MBiochem); UCL (PhD)
- Awards: Suffrage Science award (2021)
- Scientific career
- Workplaces: Royal Academy of Engineering; Cancer Research UK
- Thesis: JAK/STAT signalling (2002)
- Doctoral advisor: Ian M. Kerr
- Website: www.raeng.org.uk/about-us/staff-council-committees/chief-executive

Dame Hayaatun Sillem (née Is'harc) is the former chief executive officer (CEO) of the Royal Academy of Engineering.

== Early life and education ==
Sillem grew up in South Africa. She attended Godolphin and Latymer School. She earned an MBiochem degree in Molecular and Cellular Biochemistry from the University of Oxford in 1998. She completed a PhD in Biochemistry Signal Transduction in 2002, funded by Cancer Research UK at University College London, investigating the JAK-STAT signaling pathway supervised by Ian M. Kerr.

== Career ==
Sillem joined the Royal Academy of Engineering in 2002 as an engineering policy advisor "despite, if I'm honest, not knowing anything about engineering or policy", she said. She joined the Department for International Development 2005. In 2004 she became a Committee Specialist to the Science and Technology Select Committee, and later as a Specialist Adviser to the House of Commons Science & Technology Committee.

In 2006 Sillem joined Royal Academy of Engineering as Head of International Activities. She led the academy's partnership with Africa. In this role she published Engineering Change: Towards a sustainable future in the developing world. She went on to publish Engineers for Africa: Identifying engineering capacity needs in Sub-Saharan Africa, a summary report. The report identified the capacity needs of engineering that are felt across Sub-Saharan Africa, and developed approaches to meeting these needs.

Sillem was appointed to Director of Programmes and Fellowship in 2011. She is interested in how science and engineering can help with humanitarian admin, and how engineering can drive international development. She published Investing in Innovation in 2015. In May 2016, Sillem was appointed Director of Strategy and Deputy Chief Executive of the Royal Academy of Engineering. In March 2017 she was appointed a Fellow of the Institution of Engineering and Technology. She spoke at the launch of Angela Saini's book Inferior: How Science Got Women Wrong and the New Research That’s Rewriting the Story in June 2017.

Sillem co-founded the Royal Academy of Engineering enterprise hub. She hosted the 10th Young Arab Women Leaders STEM conference in London in December 2017. She was appointed CEO of the Royal Academy of Engineering in January 2018. She is a champion of the Government's Year of Engineering, looking to increase diversity amongst the UK's engineering workforce through the campaign This is Engineering.

In 2019 Sillem was 31st in Computer Weekly's 50 'Most Influential Women in UK Tech' shortlist.

She is a trustee of the London Transport Museum. She is a judge for St Andrews Prize for the Environment. She has written for The Huffington Post.

In May 2025 Sillem announced that she would be stepping down at the end of the calendar year from her roles at the Royal Academy of Engineering and at the Queen Elizabeth Prize for Engineering. She was succeeded by Dame Tamara Finkelstein. She was elected an Honorary Fellow of the Royal Academy of Engineering in 2026..

=== Awards and honours ===
Sillem was appointed a Commander of the Order of the British Empire (CBE) in the 2020 New Year Honours for services to international engineering. In 2021, Sillem received an Engineering and Physical Sciences Suffrage Science award. In 2022, Sillem was awarded an honorary doctorate in engineering from Newcastle University.
