= Queen Anne's Mansions =

Early block of flats in London

Coordinates: 51.49959°N 0.13430°W

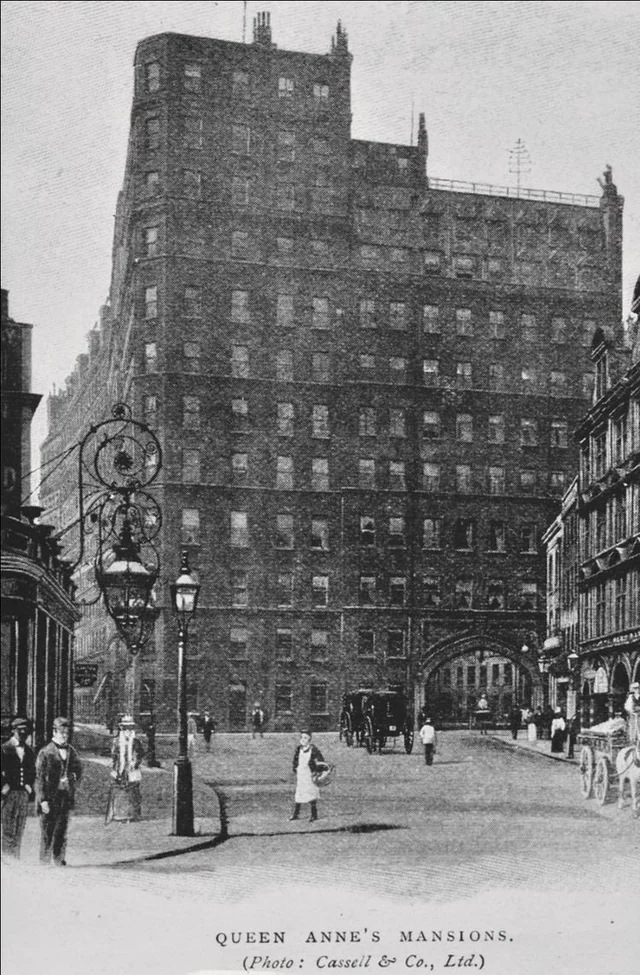
Queen Anne's Mansions in 1905

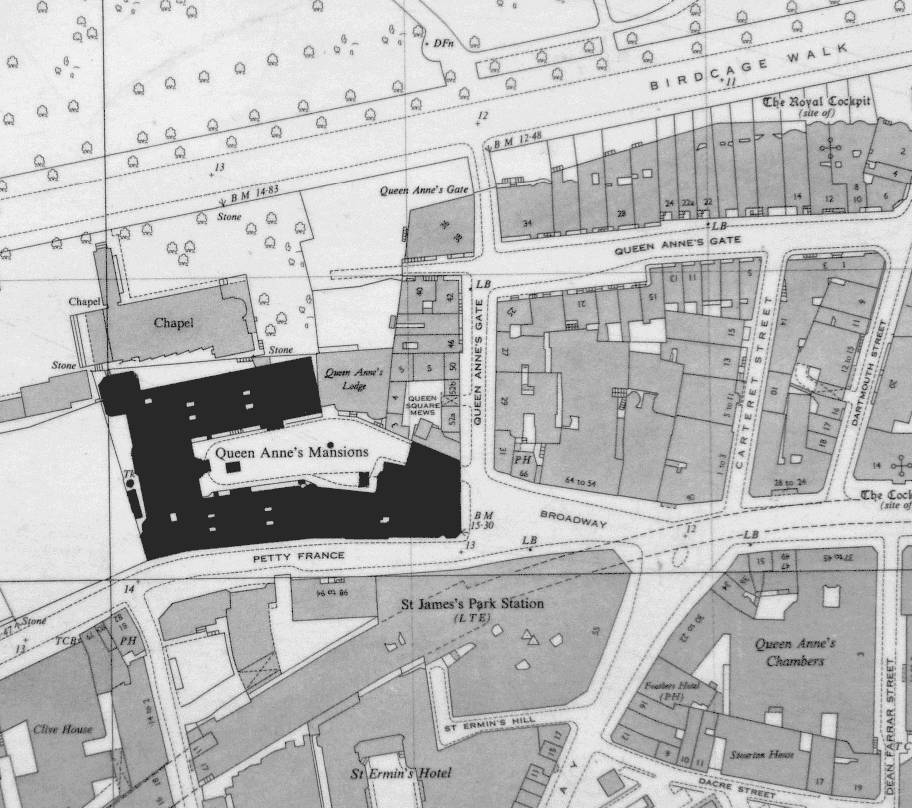
Queen Anne's Mansions (highlighted) from 1896 OS map

Queen Anne's Mansions was a block of flats in Petty France, Westminster, London, at grid reference TQ296795. In 1873, Henry Alers Hankey acquired a site between St James's Park and St James's Park Underground station. Acting as his own architect, and employing his own labour, he proceeded to erect the first stage of the block. At twelve storeys, later increased to fourteen, it was the loftiest residential building in Britain.

The Court Circular for January 1897 describes it as "a stupendous pile which, for solidity, comfort and general convenience, sets all rivals at defiance, although twenty years have elapsed and imitations have been legion."

== History ==
Hankey further extended the flats in 1874 and 1877 to the south and west. There were objections to the height of the flats, not least from Queen Victoria who could no longer view the Houses of Parliament from Buckingham Palace, but existing legislation did not explicitly prohibit building over 100 feet in height, and thus the authorities could not stop Hankey. However, the London Building Act 1894 (57 & 58 Vict. c. ccxiii), with its 80-ft height limit, was a direct result of "Hankey's Mansions".

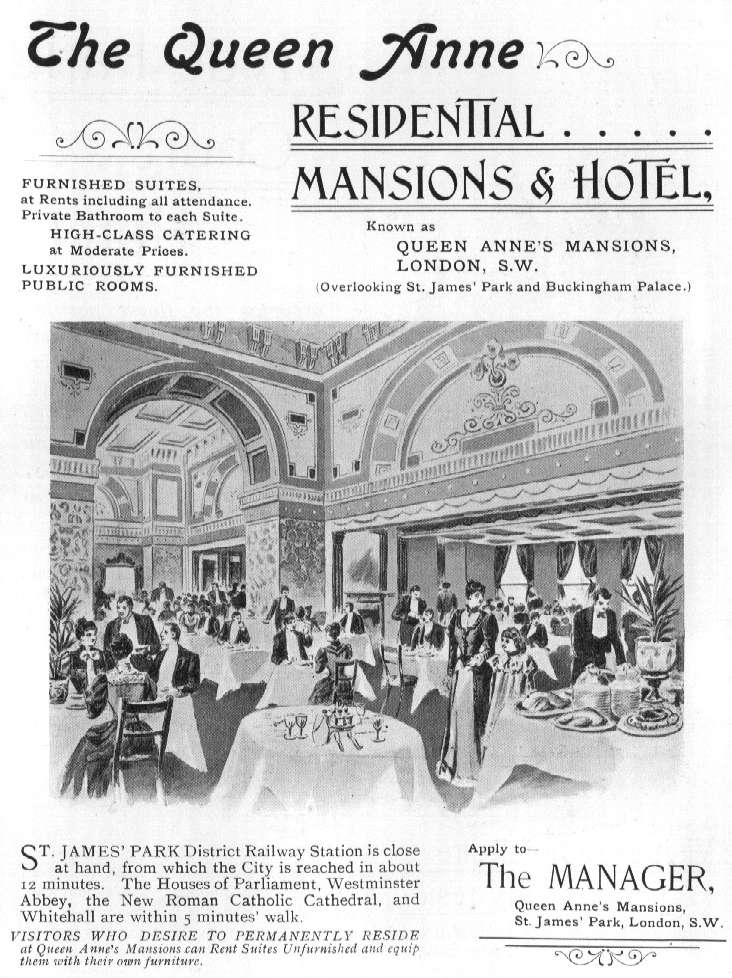
Advertisement for the hotel and mansions, 1901

It may have been legal complications that led him, for the remainder of the work, to employ an architect, E. R. Robson. Robson continued the mansions around the central courtyard, leaving Queen Anne's Lodge as the sole survivor of the residential properties that had formerly stood on the site. Just before the turn of the century, however, Hankey ran into financial difficulties and the property passed into the hands of the Official Receiver. Under new management, the west block became a hotel and the remainder was let as flats and service suites.

During the Second World War, the entire building was requisitioned as Government offices, and it was decided to construct a shelter. A long room in the west block, originally a theatre, had supporting piers built up from the foundation, and a stout reinforced concrete slab was laid to give head cover. This was a wise decision as two direct bomb-hits caused debris to overload the upper floors, causing a vertical gash through the entire building.

Queen Anne's Mansions was home to the Medical Department of the Royal Navy (Admiralty) and the Women's Royal Naval Service during the Second World War.

In 1947, the Ministry of Works retained the building on a 21-year lease. It was used as an Admiralty headquarters building, housing the Second Sea Lord's or Naval Personnel departments.

Queen Anne's Mansions was demolished in 1973, and later replaced by 50 Queen Anne's Gate.

The tall superstructures on British battleships constructed or rebuilt from the 1920s onwards, beginning with the Nelson-class, were colloquially referred to as 'Queen Anne's Mansions'.

== Facilities ==
A typical unit of accommodation was a living room, about 23 ft by 14 ft, a bedroom and a bathroom. In the corner blocks were some more commodious suites. Notwithstanding the prejudice against the building, no difficulty was found in letting the flats at high rents to tenants of the 'highest respectability'. A floor containing six rooms, without any grounds, commanded £300 per annum, and two rooms £60 per annum. The principal novelty of the building was the installation of hydraulic passenger lifts, at that time without precedent in domestic buildings in London. Fire control was also provided for by 98 hydrants, supplied from tanks storing 70,000 gallons on the roofs.

== Famous residents ==
- Edward Elgar (composer): "Elgar took a London flat in Queen Anne's Mansions so as to be able to concentrate on the concerto"
- Augusta, Lady Gregory (Irish dramatist and folklorist): "AG had given up her rooms in Queen Anne's Mansions before leaving for Italy on 17 Mar," ... "she leased new rooms in Queen's Anne's Mansions at the beginning of 1902"
- Harry Johnston (British explorer): "Arrived in London toward the end of June 1888, I established myself at Queen Anne's Mansions, in a small but comfortable flat on the sixth floor"
- Eliza Lynn Linton (British novelist, essayist, and journalist)
- Frederic Hervey Foster Quin (medical doctor who first established homeopathy in Britain): "Quin died of bronchitis at the Garden Mansions, Queen Anne's Gate, Westminster, on 24 November 1878"
- Sir John Fowler (civil engineer) who had lodgings on the site prior to the building of the mansions. "Sir John Fowler retained in the reconstructed buildings an office which is still known as 2, Queen Square Place. There is no number one, nor any other house in the 'Place'". Fowler's insistence in keeping his old address confused many of his clients, who would regularly end up in other parts of London. His working partner, Benjamin Baker, tried in vain to get him to accept the change of address, but Fowler "asked his partner to yield to the foible of an old man."
- George Parker Bidder Jr. QC, an eminent Victorian lawyer.
