= Timothy J. Ley =

American hematologist

Timothy J. Ley, MD
- Timothy J. Ley
- Scientific career
- Workplaces: Washington University School of Medicine

Timothy James Ley is an American hematologist and cancer biologist. He is the Lewis T. and Rosalind B. Apple Professor of Oncology in the department of medicine, and former chief of the section of stem cell biology in the division of oncology at Washington University in St. Louis. He is the co-director of the Oliver Langenberg Physician-Scientist Training Program in the Department of Medicine, and is a member of the Alvin J. Siteman Cancer Center. In 2026, he was elected to the American Philosophical Society.

Ley's research group focuses on the genetics and genomics of acute myeloid leukemia (AML). His lab studies the development of normal and leukemic blood cells. His work is focused on identifying the mutations and epigenetic events that are responsible for the initiation and progression of AML.

Ley led the team that sequenced the first cancer genome (from an AML patient). He has gone on to develop projects that will use whole genome sequencing to help diagnose and treat patients with AML.

To better understand the role of many of the mutations discovered through whole genome sequencing of leukemias, he and his colleagues have constructed several mouse models of AML, which are very similar to human AML. Dr. Ley's laboratory has also helped to define the roles of granzymes for the functions of cytotoxic and regulatory T cells.

Ley grew up in Lakota, Iowa. He received his B.A. degree from Drake University in 1974, and his M.D. from Washington University School of Medicine in 1978. He did his internship and residency in Medicine at Massachusetts General Hospital, was a clinical associate at the NHLBI (National Heart, Lung, and Blood Institute), a Hematology-Oncology Fellow at Washington University Medical Center, and a senior investigator at the NHLBI before moving to Washington University in 1986.

In 2015, Ley was appointed to the National Cancer Advisory Board by President Obama. Ley was the recipient of the Leopold Griffuel Prize for Basic Science in 2022.

== Awards and honors ==
- Recipient, Leopold Griffuel Prize for Basic Science, Fondation ARC, Paris, France, 2022
- Elected, National Academy of Sciences, 2019
- Alfred G. Knudson Prize for Cancer Genetics, National Cancer Institute, 2015
- Recipient, The Erasmus Hematology Award, Erasmus MC, 2015
- Recipient, E. Donnall Thomas Prize, American Society of Hematology, 2012
- Recipient, The George Engelmann Interdisciplinary Award, Academy of Science, St. Louis, 2012
- Elected, American Academy of Arts and Sciences, 2010
- Treasurer, Association of American Physicians, 2007–2012
- Elected, National Academy of Medicine, 2003
- Fellow, American Association for the Advancement of Science, 2002
- President, American Society for Clinical Investigation, 1997–1998
