= Biology Open =

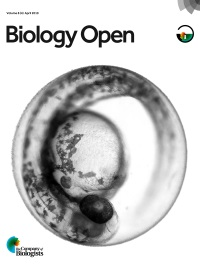
- Discipline: Biology
- Language: English
- Edited by: Daniel Gorelick

Publication details
- History: 2011–present
- Publisher: The Company of Biologists (United Kingdom)
- Frequency: Monthly
- Open access: Yes
- License: CC BY
- Impact factor: 2.4 (2022)

Standard abbreviations
- ISO 4: Biol. Open

Indexing
- ISSN: 2046-6390
- LCCN: 2012243267

Links
- Journal homepage; Online image archive; Journal publisher

Biology Open (BiO) is an online-only peer-reviewed Open Access scientific journal published by The Company of Biologists. It was launched in 2011 and publishes research across the breadth of the biological and biomedical sciences. Biology Open is part of the Review Commons initiative, is integrated with bioRxiv for co-submission and is partnered with the Web of Science Reviewer Recognition Service (previously Publons).

== Content ==
Biology Open publishes Research articles, Methods & Techniques papers, Meeting Reviews and Future Leader Reviews.

The journal operates on a continuous publication model. The final version of record is immediately released online as soon as it is ready.

All papers are published as Open Access articles under the CC-BY licence.

== Abstracting and indexing ==
Biology Open is abstracted and/or indexed by:

- Biological Abstracts
- CAB Abstracts
- Chemical Abstracts
- Thomson ISI
- PubMed Central
- PubMed
- Scopus

It is a member of OASPA (Open Access Scholarly Publishers Association) and is indexed in the DOAJ (Directory of Open Access Journals).

Biology Open is a signatory of the San Francisco Declaration on Research Assessment (DORA).

== Management ==
The founding editor-in-chief was Jordan Raff, from 2011-2018.

Steven Kelly was the Editor-in-Chief 2018-2023.

Steve launched the Future Leader and A Year at the Forefront Reviews initiative, designed to help early-career researchers establish themselves in their field.

The Directors of The Company of Biologists appointed Daniel Gorelick Editor-in-Chief in July 2023.
