= James Briscoe =

Senior group leader at the Francis Crick Institute in London

James Briscoe FRS FMedSci
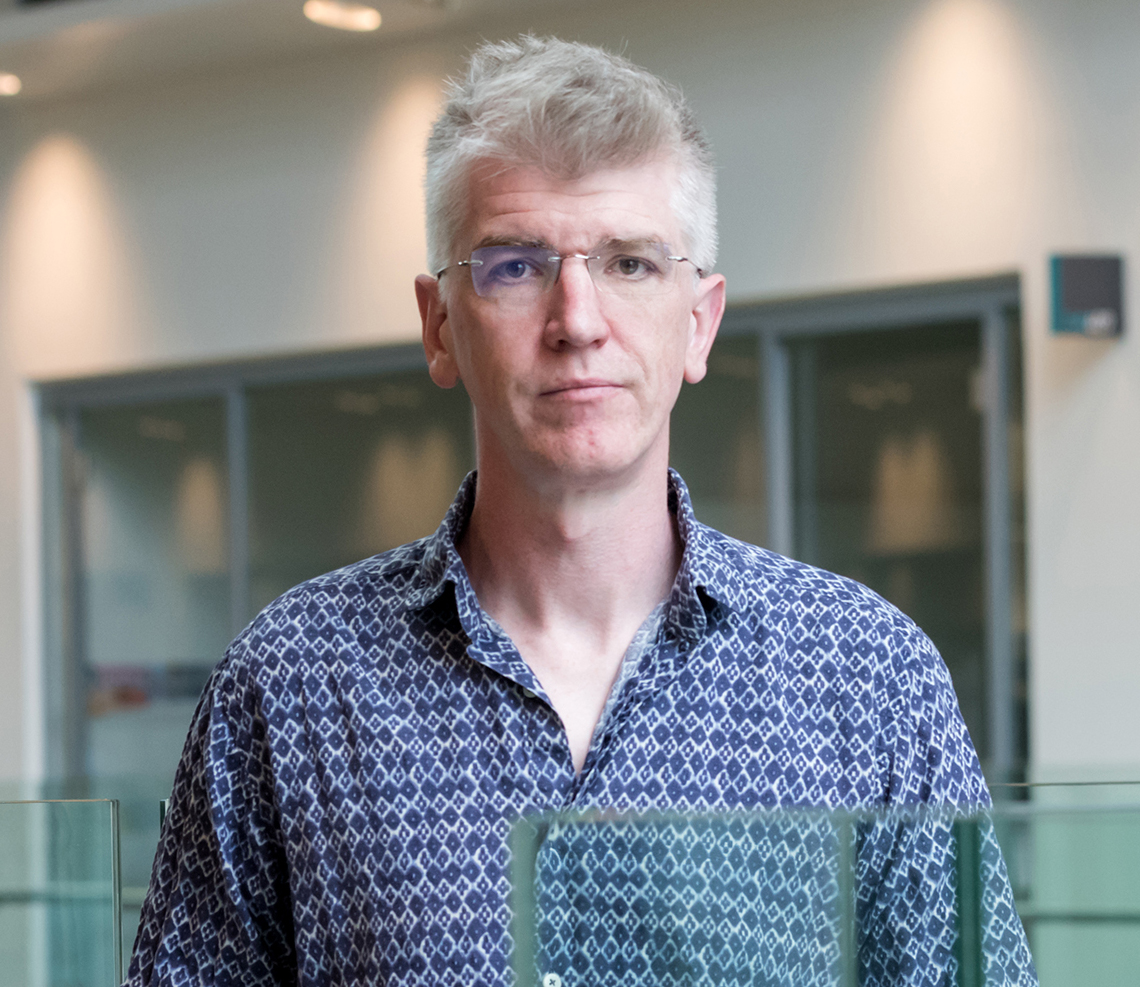
- Education: University of Warwick; King's College London
- Awards: EMBO Gold Medal (2008); EMBO Member (2009)
- Scientific career
- Fields: Developmental biology
- Workplaces: Francis Crick Institute; Columbia University; National Institute for Medical Research
- Thesis: JAKs, STATs and signal transduction in response to the interferons and interleukin-6 (1996)
- Doctoral advisor: Ian M. Kerr
- Website: briscoelab.org/james-briscoe/

James Briscoe is a British scientist who is a senior group leader at the Francis Crick Institute in London and editor-in-chief of the journal Development.

== Education ==
Briscoe was educated at the University of Warwick and King's College London where he was awarded a PhD in 1996 for research on Janus kinases, Signal Transducers and Activators of Transcriptions (STATs) and signal transduction in response to the interferons and Interleukin-6 supervised by Ian M. Kerr.

== Research and career ==
Briscoe was a postdoctoral researcher at Columbia University with Thomas Jessell. In 2000 he moved to the National Institute for Medical Research to establish his own research group and in 2001 he was elected an EMBO Young Investigator.

His research interests include the molecular and cellular mechanisms of embryonic development with a particular focus on the developing spinal cord with a particular interest in how sonic hedgehog gradients and the hedgehog signaling pathway regulate the development of this tissue. To address these questions, he uses a range of experimental biology and computational biology techniques with model systems that include laboratory mouse and chick embryos as well as embryonic stem cells.

=== Awards and honours ===
Briscoe was awarded the EMBO Gold Medal in 2008 and elected a member of the European Molecular Biology Organization (EMBO) in 2009. In 2018 he became editor-in-chief of the journal Development. He was elected a Fellow of the Royal Society (FRS) in 2019 and is a Fellow of the Academy of Medical Sciences (FMedSci).
