= Elizabeth Patton =

Fellow of the Royal Society of Edinburgh, professor of chemical genetics

Elizabeth Patton PhD FRSE
- Born: Halifax, Nova Scotia, Canada
- Other names: E.Elizabeth Patton, Liz Patton
- Education: Dalhousie University (BSc); University of Toronto (PhD)
- Occupations: Professor of chemical genetics, Personal Chair of Melanoma Genetics and Drug Discovery
- Employer: MRC Human Genetics Unit
- Awards: Fellow of the Royal Society of Edinburgh 2021

Elizabeth Patton, Ph.D FRSE is professor of chemical genetics and group leader of Medical Research Council Institute for Genetics and Molecular Medicine (IGMM) Human Genetics Unit in Edinburgh, Personal Chair of Melanoma Genetics and Drug Discovery for a disease which kills 20,000 Europeans a year, and accounts for 80% of all skin cancer deaths. Her research into the genetic models and drug interactions testing, sharing international findings, is mainly using zebrafish in conjunction with the Edinburgh Cancer Research Centre. She holds a number of academic leadership roles in UK, Europe and international scientific bodies.

In 2021, she was made a Fellow of the Royal Society of Edinburgh.

== Biography ==
E. Elizabeth Patton was born in Halifax, Nova Scotia and completed her bachelor of science (honours) degree at King's College Dalhousie University, before undertaking her doctorate at the University of Toronto, with Michael Tyers on how E3 ubiquitin ligases control cell division. She won a Human Frontier Science Programme postdoctoral fellowship (2001-2004) working with Leonard Zon at Harvard Medical School and a Medical Research Council fellowship to the University of Oxford, developing BRAF zebrafish model for melanoma, which is now used globally. She heads her own lab at the MRC Human Genetics Unit in Edinburgh.

Patton is on the Scientific Advisory Committee of the Lister Institute of Preventive Medicine and helps selecting young scientists for the Lister Prize. In 2020, Patton was successfully appointed Editor-in-Chief of the academic journal, Disease Models & Mechanisms with Elaine Mardis as Deputy Editor-in-Chief. On being elected as a Fellow of the Royal Society of Edinburgh (2021), Professor Patton is serving on the RSE Industry Working Group.

Earlier in her career (2012) she collaborated with colleagues at St. Andrews University on understanding drug mechanisms in the treatment of sleeping sickness and similar diseases. In April 2013, she was made a member of the Young Academy of Scotland.

Now with her own MRC laboratory, the ongoing focus of study is zebrafish genetic / drug interactions and melanocyte and melanoma biology, which aims to translate to human genetics or medical advances. In 2013 she said, "The thrill of discovery is what keeps scientists going, especially when we're on the road to being able to provide cures and better therapies." Patton was the first President of the international Zebrafish Disease Models Society (2013-2015) and co-leads their Drug Discovery Research Interest Group, as well as holding leadership roles in the European Zebrafish Society and the Society for Melanoma Research, of which she is Secretary. She is on the Medical Review Panel of the Canadian international award organisation, the Gairdner Foundation.

In 2016 she co-edited Zebrafish - Methods and Protocols in the Methods in Molecular Biology textbook series.

From 2017-18, Patton was a supervisor in OPTIMA (4 year programme) an EPSRC and MRC co-funded Centre for Doctoral Training in Optical Medical Imaging for cutting-edge optical technology to address key clinical questions via medical imaging (hosted both at the University of Edinburgh and the University of Strathclyde).

The Melanoma Research Alliance and L'Oreal Paris funded her research, as described to the readers of Stylist magazine in 2018, and she was interviewed by the Melanoma Association about the possibilities for Women in STEM. She was a speaker at the European Society for Dermatological Research in 2019. In 2020 she also spoke about why her work was with animal models. Patton is also one of the UK Pharmacogenetics & Stratified Medicine Network which brings clinical, academic and industry parties together.

In 2021, as well as becoming a FRSE, and her research findings continuing, Patton will serve on the UK Medical Research Council Molecular & Cellular Medicine Board.

She is married to an academic specialist in Greek literature and papyrology, and has a son and daughter.

== Selected publications from Patton laboratory ==
- Wilms Tumor 1b defines a wound-specific sheath cell subpopulation associated with notochord repair 13 Feb 2018 in eLife, vol. 7
- Mosaic RAS/MAPK variants cause sporadic vascular malformations which respond to targeted therapy 2 Apr 2018 in Journal of Clinical Investigation, vol. 128, pp. 1496–1508
- ALDH1 bio-activates nifuroxazide to eradicate ALDHHigh melanoma-initiating cells 20 Dec 2018 in Cell Chemical Biology, vol. 25, pp. 1456–1469.e6
- Zebrafish MITF-low melanoma subtype models reveal transcriptional subclusters and MITF-independent residual disease Nov 2019 in Cancer Research, vol. 79, pp. 5769–5784
- PRL3-DDX21 transcriptional control of endolysosomal genes restricts melanocyte stem cell differentiation 10 Aug 2020 in Developmental Cell, vol. 54, pp. 317–332.E9
