= Elaine Mardis =

American geneticist

- Education: University of Oklahoma
- Scientific career
- Workplaces: McDonnell Genome Institute; Washington University in St. Louis; Bio-Rad Laboratories

Elaine R. Mardis (born September 28, 1962) is the co-executive director of the Institute for Genomic Medicine at Nationwide Children's Hospital, where she also serves as the Nationwide Foundation Endowed Chair in Genomic Medicine. She also is professor of pediatrics at the Ohio State University College of Medicine. Mardis's research focuses on the genomic characterization of cancer and its implications for cancer medicine. She was part of the team that reported the first next-generation-based sequencing of a whole cancer genome, and participated extensively in The Cancer Genome Atlas (TCGA) and the Pediatric Cancer Genome Project (PCGP).

== Biography ==
Mardis was born in North Platte, Nebraska. She gained a passion for science at an early age, and credits her father, a chemistry professor for more than 30 years, for nurturing this passion.

She received her undergraduate degree in Zoology from the University of Oklahoma in 1984. During her senior year she took a course in biochemistry that was taught by Bruce Roe, PhD, which says opened her eyes to the world of molecular biology. She stayed at the University of Oklahoma for her doctoral studies under the supervision of Dr. Roe, who was one of the first academic scientists to have a fluorescent DNA sequencer in the laboratory. As a result, during her doctoral work Mardis learned the art of DNA sequencing, at a time when few others were doing this.

After obtaining her PhD in chemistry and biochemistry in 1989, Mardis did postgraduate work in industry at Bio-Rad Laboratories in Hercules, California.

In 1993, Mardis joined the faculty of Washington University School of Medicine. Over the next 23 years, she held several and academic and leadership roles at the University, including serving as co-director of the McDonnell Genome Institute. In that position, she contributed substantially to the sequencing and analysis of the human genome, and was instrumental in establishing the utility of massively parallel sequencing technologies for understanding cancer biology. Her work in cancer genetics and genomics has provided insights into the genetic drivers of many types of cancer, including acute myeloid leukemia, breast cancer, glioblastoma, and lung adenocarcinoma. By better defining the landscape of germline and somatic alterations, this research helps drive new strategies for treating cancer, and is central to the concept of precision medicine.

Since joining Nationwide Children's Hospital in 2016, Mardis research has incorporated next-generation sequencing assays and established knowledge about cancer genomics into clinical and therapeutic decision-making, and into the design of new approaches to cancer immunotherapy.

In 2015, Mardis helped launch an open access, precision medicine journal, Molecular Case Studies, in conjunction with Cold Spring Harbor Laboratory Press. She currently serves as Editor-in-Chief. In 2020 she was Deputy Editor-in-Chief of Disease Models & Mechanisms journal, with Elizabeth Patton the Editor-in-Chief. She has co-authored more than 250 articles in many prestigious publications, such as Cell, Journal of Clinical Oncology, Blood and Cancer Epidemiology, Biomarkers & Prevention.

Mardis was elected as president of the American Association for Cancer Research for 2019–2020.

== Awards and honors ==
- 2010: Scripps Translational Research Award
- 2011: Distinguished Alumna Award from the College of Arts and Sciences, Oklahoma University
- 2016: Morton K. Schwartz Award for Significant Contributions in Cancer Research Diagnostics from the American Association for Clinical Chemistry
- 2017: Precision Medicine World Congress 2017 Luminary Award
- 2019: Elected to the 2019 class of Fellows of the American Association for Cancer Research (AACR) Academy
