= Disease Models & Mechanisms =

- Discipline: Pathology
- Language: English
- Edited by: Elizabeth Patton

Publication details
- History: 2008–present
- Publisher: The Company of Biologists (United Kingdom)
- Frequency: Monthly
- Open access: Yes
- Impact factor: 4.3 (2022)

Standard abbreviations
- ISO 4: Dis. Models Mech.

Indexing
- ISSN: 1754-8403 (print); 1754-8411 (web)
- LCCN: 2008243837
- OCLC no.: 268958836

Links
- Journal homepage; Online issue archive; Journal publisher

Disease Models & Mechanisms (DMM) is a monthly peer-reviewed Open Access biomedical journal published by The Company of Biologists that launched in 2008. DMM is part of the Review Commons initiative, is integrated with bioRxiv for co-submission and is partnered with the Web of Science Reviewer Recognition Service (previously Publons).

== Scope and content ==
DMM publishes original research, resources and reviews that focus on the use of model systems to better understand, diagnose and treat human disease.

Model systems of interest include:

- Vertebrates such as mice, zebrafish, frogs, rats and other mammals
- Invertebrates such as Drosophila melanogaster and Caenorhabditis elegans
- Unique in vitro or ex vivo models, such as stem-cell-based models, organoids and systems based on patient material
- Microorganisms such as yeast and Dictyostelium
- Other biological systems with relevance to human disease research

Disease areas of interest include:

- Cancer
- Neurodegenerative and neurological diseases
- Psychiatric disorders
- Metabolic disorders, including diabetes and obesity
- Cardiovascular diseases, stroke and hypertension
- Gastrointestinal diseases
- Infectious diseases
- Autoimmunity and inflammation
- Developmental diseases
- Musculoskeletal disorders
- Renal or liver disease
- Eye disorders
- Drug and biomarker discovery/screening
- Stem cell therapies in regenerative medicine

The journal operates on a continuous publication model. The final version of record is immediately released online as soon as it is ready.

All papers are published as Open Access articles under the CC-BY licence.

== Abstracting and indexing ==
The journal is abstracted and/or indexed by:

- BIOBASE
- CAB abstracts
- Cambridge Scientific Abstracts
- Clarivate Analytics Web of Science
- EMBASE
- Medline
- Scopus

It is a member of OASPA (Open Access Scholarly Publishers Association) and is indexed in the DOAJ (Directory of Open Access Journals).

Disease Models & Mechanisms is a signatory of the San Francisco Declaration on Research Assessment (DORA).

== Management ==
The founding editor-in-chief was Vivian Siegel (2008-2013), followed by Ross Cagan (2013-2016) and Monica J. Justice (2016-2020).

Elizabeth Patton was appointed Editor-in-Chief in December 2020, with Elaine Mardis as Deputy Editor-in-Chief.
