= The Company of Biologists =

British academic publisher

- Founded: 1925
- Founder: George Parker Bidder III
- Country of origin: United Kingdom
- Headquarters location: Cambridge
- Publication types: Academic journals
- Nonfiction topics: Science
- Official website: www.biologists.com

The Company of Biologists is a UK-based charity and not-for-profit publisher that was established in 1925 by George Parker Bidder III with the aim of promoting research and study across all branches of biology. The company publishes currently five scientific journals: Development, Journal of Cell Science, Journal of Experimental Biology, Disease Models & Mechanisms and Biology Open.

As part of its charitable giving, the company awards grants and travelling fellowships to biologists as well as running a series of workshops.

The company's current chairperson is Professor Sarah Bray.

In 2023, The Company of Biologists launched its biodiversity publishing initiative "The Forest of Biologists".

== Brief history ==
George Parker Bidder III, a prominent zoologist working in Europe during the late 19th and early 20th centuries, founded The Company of Biologists in 1925 in a bid to rescue the ailing journal The British Journal of Experimental Biology (now The Journal of Experimental Biology), which was founded in 1923 by Julian Huxley, Lancelot Hogben and Frances A. E. Crew.

Bidder felt that the journal was crucial for this emerging area of biology so turned to friends and colleagues, selling them £5 shares in his newly formed The Company of Biologists. Such was the company's success that, in 1946, Bidder gifted the Quarterly Journal of Microscopical Science to them, which was later relaunched as Journal of Cell Science.

In 1952 the company became a registered charity and a year later, in 1953, it accepted the gift of a third journal, the Journal of Embryology and Experimental Morphology (relaunched in 1987 as Development).

In August 2008 Disease Models & Mechanisms was launched to reflect the increasing importance of model organisms in the understanding of human disease; it is an open access journal.

In autumn 2011, the company launched a fifth journal, Biology Open, an online only, open access that publishes original research across all aspects of the biological sciences.

The company's charitable status has the condition that none of the directors receive any remuneration for their services, so directors give their time and expertise as part of their contribution to the scientific community.

The company seal, featuring an ankh and a feather representing the goddess Maat

== Charitable activities ==
The company provides grants to many scientific societies, large and small. These societies, in turn, use part of the funding to provide travel grants to support postgraduates and junior postdoctoral fellows who wish to attend their conferences. Each of the company's journals provides travelling fellowships to postgraduate students and postdoctoral fellows and these are put towards the cost of collaborative visits to other research laboratories. The company also invites direct applications from postgraduate and postdoctoral fellows for travel grants towards the cost of attendance at research conferences, workshops or for skill-acquiring visits to other research labs.

As participants in the United Nations' Health InterNetwork Access to Research Initiative (HINARI) and OARE initiatives, the company makes all its online articles freely available to users in developing countries

In 2010, the company launched its series of workshops intended to champion the novel techniques and innovations that will underpin the post-genomic revolution.

== Community sites ==
The Company of Biologists supports three online biological communities:

- the Node: the community site for and by developmental and stem cell biologists
- preLights: the preprint highlights service run by the biological community
- FocalPlane: the community site for microscopists and biologists alike
