= Martin McMahon (biologist) =

British cancer biologist

- Education: University of Glasgow (BSc 1981); King’s College London (PhD 1985)
- Known for: Conditional oncoproteins; RAF/MAPK signaling models; mechanisms of drug resistance in cancer; research in melanoma, lung, and thyroid cancers
- Awards: Lifetime Achievement Award (2022); Diana Ashby Senior Investigator Award (2006)
- Scientific career
- Fields: Cancer biology; molecular oncology; signal transduction
- Workplaces: DNAX Research Institute; University of California, San Francisco; University of Utah School of Medicine; Huntsman Cancer Institute
- Doctoral advisor: Ian M. Kerr; George Stark
- Other academic advisors: J. Michael Bishop

Martin McMahon is a Scottish cancer biologist, working in the USA since 1985, known for his work on conditional oncoproteins and RAS-regulated signaling pathways mediated by RAF protein kinases and PI3'-lipid kinases. His research has significantly contributed to understanding the molecular basis of melanoma, lung, and thyroid cancers, particularly mechanisms of tumor initiation, progression and drug sensitivity/resistance. He holds the Cumming–Presidential Chair of Cancer Biology in the University of Utah, Dept. of Dermatology, and serves as Senior Director for Preclinical Translation at Huntsman Cancer Institute.

== Early life and education ==
McMahon was born and raised in Glasgow, Scotland. He attended St. Conval's primary school, Holyrood secondary school, and then earned a B.Sc. (Hons) in Biochemistry from the University of Glasgow in 1981. He was awarded a Ph.D. from King’s College, University of London in 1985 for research conducted at the Imperial Cancer Research Fund and at Stanford University. His doctoral research, mentored by Dr. Ian M. Kerr and Dr. George R. Stark, focused on mechanisms of interferon signaling.

== Career ==
From 1985 to 1991, McMahon was a postdoctoral fellow in the laboratory of the 1989 Nobel Laureate J. Michael Bishop at the University of California, San Francisco (UCSF), where he studied mechanisms of oncoprotein kinase signaling. In 1991, he joined the DNAX Research Institute in Palo Alto, where he led a research group investigating the oncogenic activities of RAF family protein kinases using novel conditional oncoprotein kinases that he engineered as a postdoctoral fellow.

In 1998, McMahon returned to UCSF joining the faculty of the Helen Diller Family Comprehensive Cancer Center (led by Dr. Frank McCormick) and being appointed as the Efim Guzik Distinguished Professor of Cancer Biology (2001) and Co‑Leader of the Experimental Therapeutics Program (2011). During his tenure at UCSF, his laboratory developed key genetically engineered mouse models of human cancers driven by oncogenic BRAF and other RAS pathway mutations.

In 2015, he was recruited by Dr. John Zone and Dr. Mary Beckerle to the faculty of the Dept. of Dermatology of the University of Utah School of Medicine and to Huntsman Cancer Institute.

== Research and notable work ==
McMahon's research focuses on the molecular mechanisms driving metastatic melanoma, lung, and thyroid cancers, with a particular interest in the RAF→MEK→ERK MAPK and PI3'-lipid signaling pathways. His lab utilizes human cancer cell lines and genetically engineered mouse models to study tumor initiation, progression and response to therapy.

A significant contribution is the development of conditional BRAF^{V600E}, which have been instrumental in studying RAF→MEK→ERK MAPK pathway activation and the development of pathway-targeted therapies. His group demonstrated that inhibiting the RAF→MEK→ERK pathway can induce cytoprotective autophagy in RAS-driven cancers, suggesting that combining pathway inhibitors with autophagy inhibitors could be a therapeutic strategy. This work has led to clinical trials investigating combination therapies. More recently, his work has focussed on targeting RAS oncoproteins in melanoma.

Other notable findings include defining the cooperative interactions between BRAF^{V600E}, KRAS, and PTEN loss in melanoma progression using mouse models and investigating mechanisms of resistance to targeted therapies in melanoma and lung cancer. His laboratory has also contributed to understanding the role of the tumor microenvironment and genetic context in shaping therapeutic responses.

== Awards and honors ==
At UCSF, McMahon served as the Efim Guzik Distinguished Professor of Cancer Biology from 2001-2015. He is currently appointed at the University of Utah as the Cumming-Presidential Chair of Cancer Biology in the Dept. of Dermatology. McMahon was the 1981 recipient of the J.N. Davidson Memorial Prize in Biochemistry from the University of Glasgow. In 2006 he was the recipient of the Diana Ashby Senior Investigator Award from the Melanoma Research Foundation, which supported his early work on genetically engineered mouse models of melanoma. From 2009-13, he served as member and then Chair of the NIH Basic Mechanisms of Cancer Therapeutics (BMCT) study section. From 2015-21, he further served the NIH as a member and then Chair of the National Cancer Institute's Board of Scientific Counsellors. He has also served as President of the Society for Melanoma Research (2013–16) and President of the Cancer Molecular Therapeutics Research Association (2022-Date). In 2017 he was the recipient of the American Skin Association "Leadership in Melanoma Research" award and then, in 2022, the recipient of the Society for Melanoma Research "Lifetime Achievement Award", recognizing his significant contributions to the field.

== Selected publications ==
- Samuels, M. L.; Weber, M. J.; Bishop, J. M.; McMahon, M. (1993). "Conditional transformation of cells and rapid activation of the mitogen-activated protein kinase cascade by an estradiol-dependent human raf-1 protein kinase". Molecular and Cellular Biology. 13 (10). American Society for Microbiology: 6241–6252. doi:10.1128/mcb.13.10.6241-6252.1993. PMC 364683. PMID 8413224.
- Woods, D.; Parry, D.; Cherwinski, H.; Bosch, E.; Lees, E.; McMahon, M. (1997). "Raf-Induced Proliferation or Cell Cycle Arrest Is Determined by the Level of Raf Activity with Arrest Mediated by p21Cip1". Molecular and Cellular Biology. 17 (9). American Society for Microbiology: 5598–5611. doi:10.1128/mcb.17.9.5598. PMC 232408.
- Dankort, D.; Filenova, E.; Collado, M.; Serrano, M.; Jones, K.; McMahon, M. (2007). "A new mouse model to explore the initiation, progression, and therapy of BRAFV600E-induced lung tumors". Genes & Development. 21 (4). Cold Spring Harbor Laboratory: 379–384. doi:10.1101/gad.1516407. PMC 1804325. PMID 17299132.
- Kinsey, C. G.; McMahon, M. (2019-04-04). "Protective autophagy elicited by RAF–MEK–ERK inhibition suggests a treatment strategy for RAS-driven cancers". Nature Medicine. 25 (4): 620–627. doi:10.1038/s41591-019-0367-9. PMC 6452642. PMID 30833748.
- Truong, A.; Yoo, J. H.; Scherzer, M. T.; Sanchez, J. M. S.; Dale, K. J.; Kinsey, C. G.; Richards, J. R.; Shin, D.; Ghazi, P. C.; Onken, M. D.; Blumer, K. J.; Odelberg, S. J.; McMahon, M. (2020). "Chloroquine Sensitizes GNAQ/11-mutated Melanoma to MEK1/2 Inhibition". Clinical Cancer Research. 26 (23). AACR: 6374–6386. doi:10.1158/1078-0432.CCR-20-1675. PMC 7710560. PMID 32933997.

== Media and interviews ==
McMahon has been featured in media discussing his research and career path. He was interviewed in the "Talks with Docs" series by the Huntsman Cancer Institute in April 2025, where he discussed his background and research philosophy. He has also been interviewed regarding specific research findings, such as the synergy between MAPK inhibitors and autophagy inhibition in RAS-driven cancers.
