= Samuel Achilefu =

Nigerian-American scientist, professor, and medical researcher

- Born: Obingwa, Nigeria
- Education: University of Nancy
- Known for: CancerVision Goggles
- Awards: Britton Chance Biomedical Optics Award; St. Louis Award
- Scientific career
- Fields: Cancer Imaging; Cancer Therapy
- Workplaces: Washington University School of Medicine

Samuel Achilefu is a Nigerian-born scientist and medical researcher who has pioneered both fundamental and applied research in science, engineering, and medicine. Achilefu is professor and chair of the Department of Biomedical Engineering at the University of Texas Southwestern Medical Center, where he holds the Lyda Hill Distinguished University Chair in Biomedical Engineering. He is also Professor of Radiology and a member of the Simmons Comprehensive Cancer Center. Before joining UT Southwestern, he was the Michel M. Ter-Pogossian Professor of Radiology and Vice Chair for Innovation and Entrepreneurship at the Mallinckrodt Institute of Radiology at Washington University School of Medicine. He held joint appointments as a professor of medicine, biochemistry and molecular biophysics, and biomedical engineering. He also served as the Director of the Washington University in St. Louis Molecular Imaging Center and the privately funded Theranostic Innovation Program and was co-director of the Center for Multiple Myeloma Nanotherapy and co-Leader of the Oncologic Imaging Program of the Alvin J. Siteman Cancer Center at Washington University.

Achilefu is a member of the National Academy of Medicine and a fellow of the National Academy of Inventors as well as many professional societies, including the Royal Society of Chemistry, American Association for the Advancement of Science, the Optical Society of America, the International Society for Optics and Photonics Engineers (SPIE), the American Institute for Medical and Biological Engineering, and the St. Louis Academy of Science. A member of the National Advisory Council for Biomedical Imaging and Bioengineering (NACBIB) and the Scientific Advisory Board of the National Cancer Institute’s intramural Molecular Imaging Program, he also serves as Editor-in-Chief of Current Analytical Chemistry and an editorial board member of many scientific publications. Achilefu is a former trustee of Loma Linda University in California. He was a member of the College of Reviewers for the National Institutes of Health (NIH) and served as a member and chair of grant review panels for the NIH, the Department of Defense (DoD), and the Susan G. Komen Foundation.

== Education and early life ==
Achilefu was born in Northern Nigeria before his parents relocated to Osaa-Ukwu, their hometown in Obingwa, present day Abia State of Nigeria. He earned his PhD from the University of Nancy in France as a French Government Scholar and his postdoctoral training at Oxford University in England.

He was recruited from Oxford to St. Louis to work for Mallinckrodt Medical in 1993 and joined the Mallinckrodt Institute of Radiology at Washington University in 2001, where he established the more than 80-member Optical Radiology program at the School of Medicine.

== Research ==
Achilefu is an expert in the development and use of light-sensitive drugs for cancer detection, imaging, and therapy. In 2016, he conceived and led the development of a novel wearable cancer viewing goggles, known as CancerVision Goggles, for the accurate removal of cancer cells during surgery. The cancer goggle works on the principle of optical imaging. Optical imaging enables real-time visualization of intrinsic and exogenous contrast within biological tissues. CancerVision Goggles are designed to make it easier for surgeons to distinguish malignant cells from healthy cells, helping to ensure that no stray tumor cells are left behind during surgery to remove a cancerous tumor. He also discovered a novel treatment paradigm for cancer using a special type of light and non-pharmacological doses of drugs to selectively trigger cancer cell death without harming healthy tissue. These and many other innovations have resulted in 59 issued US patents and over 300 scientific papers.

Achilefu has received over 30 local, national, and international honors and awards, including the Britton Chance Biomedical Optics Award in 2019 at SPIE, Distinguished Investigator Award in 2018 (Academy for Radiology & Biomedical Imaging Research), the Carl and Gerty Cori Faculty Achievement Award in 2018 (Washington University), Excellence in Healthcare Award in 2017 (St. Louis American), the first Department of Defense Distinguished Investigator Award in 2016 (DoD Breast Cancer Research Program), IEEE Donald G. Fink Award (2016), Outstanding Scientist Award in 2015 (St. Louis Academy of Science), Best Global Impact 2015 (Alive magazine), St. Louis Innovator Award 2015, the Medical Innovation Award in 2014 (St. Louis Business Journal), St. Louis Award in 2014 (St. Louis Award Committee), Featured Innovator 2014 (Bloomberg BusinessWeek), Achiever Award 2008 (Blacks in Science), Extraordinary Performance Award 1998 (Mallinckrodt, Inc.), and Technical Innovation Award 1995 (Mallinckrodt Medical, Inc.).

Achilefu is featured in many public media. Representative examples include:

- Physics Worlds – Optics and Photonics Spotlight
- SPIE announces 2019 Society Awards
- Scientists Report Advances in Light-source Medicine to Help Fight Metastatic Cancer
- National Public Radio; Story Collider: When science complicates home and family
- 2018 AAAS Fellows approved by the AAAS Council
- Tumor imaging technique has potential as anti-cancer weapon, mouse study shows
- Glasses that make cancer glow
- New high-tech glasses detect cancer cells during surgery
- Goggles help surgeons ‘see’ tumours
- Special glasses help surgeons ‘see’ cancer
- Who To Watch: Samuel Achilefu, PhD
- New ‘Cancer Goggles’ help surgeons spot malignant tumors
- Hi-tech goggles 'detect cancer cells”
- Cancer-Spotting Goggles Help Surgeons Remove Diseased Cells
- Medical Innovator Award: Sam Achilefu, Washington University School of Medicine
- Inventor of 'Cancer Goggles' Receives St. Louis Award
- Academy of Science-St. Louis honors Washington University researchers
- Achilefu receives prestigious St. Louis Award

== Honors and awards ==
1995	Technical Innovation Award, Mallinckrodt Medical, Inc.
1998	Extraordinary Performance Award, Mallinckrodt, Inc.
2001-present	Editorial Board, Journal of Biomedical Optics
2002-present	Co-Editor, Proceedings of the SPIE on Molecular Reporters/Probes for Biomedical Applications
2004-2008	Member, Microscopic Imaging Study Section, National Institute of Health (NIH)
2004-2008	Member, Breast Cancer and Era of Hope Scholars peer-review panels, Department of Health (DoD)
2004-present	Member, Scientific Advisory Board, National Cancer Institute's Intramural Molecular Imaging Program
2008	Achiever Award, St. Louis Science Center
2008	Fellow, SPIE – International society for optics and photonics
2009-2018	Member, NIH Medical Imaging Study Section
2010-2015	Overseas Distinguished International Professor, China Pharmaceutical University
2010	Chair, Review Panel on Lung Cancer Research Program Collaborative Translational Research Award, CDMRP, DoD
2011	Chair, SBIR Molecular Imaging and Cell Biology Study Section, NIH
2011	SPIE Fellow, International Society for Optics and Photonics
2011	St Louis innovator award, Alive magazine 2011
2012-2016	Member, Board of Trustees, Loma Linda University, CA
2013-present	Editorial Board, Scientific Reports
2014	Medical Innovator Award, St. Louis Business Journal
2014	Inventor, Bloomberg BusinessWeek (March 2014)
2014	St. Louis Award
2014	Outstanding scientist fellow award, academy of Science
2014-present	Editor-in-Chief, Current Analytical Chemistry
2015	St. Louis Innovator Award (Alive magazine)
2015	Best Global Impact Award, We Heart Stl
2015	Fellow, Academy of Science – St. Louis
2016	Donald G. Fink Award, IEEE
2016	Fellow, the Royal Society of Chemistry
2017	Fellow, Optical Society of America
2017	St. Louis American Excellence in Healthcare Award
2018	Fellow, National Academy of Inventors
2018	Carl and Gerty Cori Faculty Achievement Award
2018	Fellow, American Association for the Advancement of Science (AAAS)
2019	Britton Chance Biomedical Optics Award
2019	Fellow, American Institute for Medical and Biological Engineering (AIMBE)
2019	SPIE Britton Chance Biomedical Optics Award
2020	Member, National Advisory Council for Biomedical Imaging and Bioengineering, NIH
2020	Fellow, Royal Society of Medicine
2025	Member, National Academy of Engineering

== Bibliography ==
- Samuel Achilefu Google Scholar Profile: https://scholar.google.com/citations?hl=en&user=YywM5OwAAAAJ&view_op=list_works&sortby=pubdate
- Search Results for author Achilefu S on PubMed.
- Samuel Achilefu, director of Optical Radiology Laboratory: https://opticalradiologylab.wustl.edu/people/samuel-achilefu-phd/
- Samuel Achilefu Facebook page: https://www.facebook.com/samuel.achilefu
- Samuel Achilefu Twitter page: https://twitter.com/samuelachilefu?lang=en
