= George Parker (footballer) =

Australian rules footballer

Personal information
- Full name: George Andrew Parker
- Born: 20 January 1921; Perth, Western Australia
- Died: 12 March 2002 (aged 81); Subiaco, Western Australia
- Original team: Claremont Seconds / Northam
- Height: 184 cm (6 ft 0 in)
- Weight: 81 kg (179 lb)

Playing career^{1}
Years	Club	Games (Goals)
1942	St Kilda	1 (0)
- ^{1} Playing statistics correct to the end of 1942.

George Andrew Parker (20 January 1921 – 12 March 2002) was an Australian rules footballer who played with St Kilda in the Victorian Football League (VFL).

Parker served in the Australian Army during World War II.
