= Ian M. Kerr =

English medical researcher

Ian Kerr FRS FMedSci
- Born: Ian Macpherson Kerr
- Education: University of St Andrews (BSc); University of London (PhD)
- Awards: EMBO Member (1986); William B. Coley Award (1999)
- Scientific career
- Workplaces: National Institute for Medical Research; Imperial Cancer Research Fund; Stanford University
- Thesis: The relation between ribonucleic acid and protein metabolism in the encephalomyocarditis virus infected mouse ascites tumour cell (1963)
- Doctoral students: Hayaatun Sillem; James Briscoe

Ian Macpherson Kerr is a scientist whose research interests include the mechanism of action of the interferons, signal transduction and protein synthesis to viral infection and double-stranded RNA.

Kerr was elected a Fellow of the Royal Society in 1985 and a Fellow of the Academy of Medical Sciences in 2000.
