= Birgit Bidder =

Swedish musician

Anna Åhman, known professionally as Birgit Bidder, is a Swedish indie musician, songwriter, arranger and artist. Known for ones distinctive voice and songwriting, Birgit Bidder music often blends elements of retro pop, new wave and soul. Various instruments can also be found in Birgit's songs, including saxophones, synthesizers, vibraphones, French horns, saw and bandoneon.

Birgit Bidder has performed with artists like Ebbot Lundberg, bob hund, Moneybrother, Edda Magnason and Oskar Linnros and recorded solo albums with Grammy awarded producers like Jari Haapalainen and Niklas Perned.

She is also known under her alter ego Annie Angel, performing in productions like Chelsea Hotel at Berwaldhallen with the Swedish Radio Symphony Orchestra, on radio shows like Nordegren & Epstein i P1 and touring as an opening act for Oskar Linnros during spring 2018. In Chelsea Hotel Birgit Bidder performed Have You Ever Been (To Electric LadyLand) by Jimi Hendrix on wurlitzer with Grammy awarded jazz quartet Tonbruket. In 1967 at Gothenburg Operahouse she performed solo songs by Woody Guthrie, Sam Cooke and Velvet Underground.

== Musician ==
During spring 2022 Birgit Bidder performs in the opera Eurydike at Wermlandsoperan directed by Linus Fellbom and arranged by Hans Ek. While most of the ensemble songs were performed in French and Latin Birgit's solo numbers where mainly in German written by Einstürzende Neubauten and Nico.

Birgit Bidder sings in Hans Ek's A Tribute To Björk with the Gothenburg Symphony Orchestra, Wermlandsoperan and Norrköping Symphony Orchestra together with Edda Magnason and Moto Boy from 2018 to 2020.

During spring 2014 and summer 2015 Birgit Bidder performs as La Musica in Swedish opera house Wermlandsoperan's production L'Orfeus by Monteverdi. Directed by Kristofer Steen from Refused and arranged by Hans Ek. Other participing artists are Moto Boy and Jan Kyhle among others.

Since 2012 Birgit Bidder has performed with conductor and arranger Hans Ek and chamber orchestra Modern Fantazias, interpreting work by Brian Eno, Kraftwerk and Monteverdi among others. At venues like Drottningholms Slottsteater, Södra Teatern and music festival Sthlm music and arts.

Her song "Psalm From a Heart" is in the outro for episode 21 of the American ABC TV series Private Practice, aired 12 May 2011 in the US. Performed live on Swedish TV4 Nyhetsmorgon in May 2011.

Birgit Bidder toured as an opening act for Katie Melua in Scandinavia in May 2011. She has guest appeared with punk band Docenterna, Mattias Alkberg among others and opened for Loney Dear, Rebecka Törnqvist, Joel Alme, Deportees and Jakob Hellman.

== Other ==
Birgit Bidder sings, plays the keyboard and guitar, writes and produce her Swedish act, Raketen, including Kalle Nyman on bass, Patrik Heikinpieti on drums and Mattias Alkberg live on guitar.

== Discography ==
Solo albums:

- I Used to Dream, LP, Sing A Song Fighter
- Space Travel, Digital release, Kobalt AWAL
- The Life Home, CD, EMI

As a participating musician:

- Ison & Fille: Ikväll är vi kungar, single, (Hemmalaget) 2010
- Club 8: The People's Record, CD, (Adrian) 2010
- Kajsa Grytt: "En kvinna under påverkan", CD, (Playground) 2011
- bob hund: Vem tror jag att jag lurar?, single, (Silence) 2012
- Kajsa Grytt: "Jag ler, jag dör", CD, (Playground) 2013
- Oskar Linnros: "För sent", single, (Universal) 2013
- Conny Nimmersjö: "Tänk, nyss var här så trevligt", CD, (Novoton) 2015

== Tours ==
As a band musician:

- Erik Hassle: 2009–2010
- Veronica Maggio: 2010–2012
- Oskar Linnros: 2010–2011
