= George G. C. Parker =

American economist

George G. C. Parker (born March 29, 1939) is an American economist, finance scholar, and academic administrator known for his work in corporate finance, financial economics, and business education. He served as the Dean Witter Distinguished Professor of Finance at the Stanford Graduate School of Business and was a member of the Stanford University faculty for more than five decades.

Prior to joining Stanford University, Parker was a professor at Columbia Business School from 1967 to 1973. His academic work has focused on corporate finance, capital markets, investment decision-making, and financial strategy.

Parker was a member of the board of trustees of his Alma Mater, Haverford College from approximately 1990 to 2001.

in the private sector, parker also served on the board of directors of twenty two private companies, most notably the board of continental airlines, ishares mutual funds (managed by BlackRock), first republic bank where he was non-executive chairman for a brief period.

== Early life and education ==
Parker was born in West Chester, Pennsylvania on march 29, 1939, to John W. Parker and Elizabeth Coale Parker.

His parents were teachers at the westtown friends school (affiliated with quakers) in Westtown, Pennsylvania. Parker was raised in a traditional quaker family.

In secondary school, parker’s family moved from Pennsylvania to Southern California where he met his wife and graduated from Arcadia High School in 1956.

He earned a bachelor of arts degree from Haverford College (also a quaker college) in 1960. he later attended the Stanford University Graduate School of Business, where he received a master of business administration degree in 1962 and a PhD in business administration in 1967.

== Academic career ==
Parker joined the faculty of the Stanford Graduate School of Business in 1973 ultimately to become the Dean Witter Distinguished Professor of Finance, after previously serving as a professor of finance at Columbia Business School from 1967 to 1973.

Over the course of his academic career at Stanford, he held multiple leadership and administrative roles, including positions overseeing Executive Education and serving as senior associate dean for Academic Affairs. He also directed both the MBA Program and the Stanford MSx (formerly Sloan PROGRAM) Master’s Program, and was a member of the Stanford Faculty Senate.

From 2003 onward, Parker served as faculty chairman of the Advisory Panel on Investment Responsibility for the Board of Trustees of Stanford University, contributing to institutional governance and investment oversight. He also served on the boards of multiple organizations, including publicly traded companies, a mutual fund company, a privately held firm, and a nonprofit organization. Earlier in his career, he was a trustee of Haverford College from 1977 to 1989.

Parker’s service to Stanford has been recognized with several honors, including the Robert T. Davis Award for Faculty Lifetime Achievement in 2000 and the Distinguished Teaching Award in the Stanford MBA Program in 2006.

In 2008, former students, colleagues, and friends established the George G. C. Parker Professorship in Management in his honor. He has also been recognized for his teaching effectiveness and long-term influence on MBA and MSx students, and has continued teaching corporate finance courses even after attaining emeritus status.

In addition to his academic work, Parker served on the boards of more than twenty private companies across multiple industries.

He was also a member of the board of trustees of Haverford College from approximately 1990 to 2001.

== Research and scholarship ==
Parker’s research has focused on corporate finance, financial strategy, valuation, and investment decision-making. His scholarly work examined capital allocation, risk analysis, and managerial approaches to financial planning.

In addition to academic publications, Parker contributed to case studies and finance curriculum development at Stanford Graduate School of Business. His teaching materials were used At Stanford elsewhere in MBA and executive education programs focused on corporate financial management and strategic investment analysis.

Parker’s work intersected with broader developments in modern finance theory emerging during the second half of the twentieth century, including evolving approaches to capital markets and managerial finance.

== Awards ==
In 2000, he was awarded the Robert T. Davis Award for Faculty Lifetime Achievement in recognition of his sustained contributions to teaching, research, and academic leadership at Stanford GSB.

In 2002, he received the Stanford GSB Lifetime Achievement Award for Teaching and Faculty Service, acknowledging his extensive impact on MBA and executive education programs.

In 2006, he was awarded the Distinguished Teaching Award in the Stanford MBA Program, based on student evaluations of teaching excellence. In 2008, the George G. C. Parker Professorship in Management was established as an endowed chair by alumni and colleagues in recognition of his influence on finance education and academic leadership.

== Personal life ==
Parker is married to Joan Wolters Parker.
