= Master of Biochemistry =

A Master in Biochemistry (MBiochem or MBioch) degree is a specific master's degree for courses in the field of Biochemistry.

== United Kingdom ==
In the UK, the MBiochem degree is an undergraduate award, available after pursuing a four-year course of study at a university. It is classed as a level 7 qualification in the National Qualifications Framework.

== Germany ==
In Germany, the Master of Biochemistry is usually a graduate degree following a bachelor. It is offered by a few universities who have reorganized their teaching to be completely in English to better prepare for a scientific career that operates with English as its lingua franca. Examples are the Master of Biochemistry (M.Sc.) in Bochum and Tübingen.

== Structure ==
In terms of course structure, MBiochem degrees have the same content that is usually seen in other degree programmes, i.e. lectures, laboratory work, coursework and exams each year. A substantial project is often undertaken in the fourth-year, which typically involves independent research. At the end of the second or third years, there is usually a threshold of academic performance in examinations to be reached to allow progression into the final year. Final results are awarded on the standard British undergraduate degree classification scale.
