= Development (journal) =

- Discipline: Developmental biology
- Language: English
- Edited by: James Briscoe

Publication details
- Former names: Journal of Embryology and Experimental Morphology
- History: 1953–present
- Publisher: The Company of Biologists (United Kingdom)
- Frequency: Semi-monthly
- Open access: Delayed (after 12 months); Hybrid
- Impact factor: 4.6 (2022)

Standard abbreviations
- ISO 4: Development

Indexing
- CODEN: DEVPED
- ISSN: 0950-1991 (print); 1477-9129 (web)
- OCLC no.: 15088415

Links
- Journal homepage; Online issue archive; Journal publisher

Development is a bi-weekly peer-reviewed scientific journal in the field of developmental biology that covers cellular and molecular mechanisms of animal and plant development. It is published by The Company of Biologists. Development is partnered with Publons, is part of the Review Commons initiative and has two-way integration with bioRxiv.

In 2009, the BioMedical & Life Sciences Division of the Special Libraries Association included Development in their list of top 100 journals in Biology and Medicine over the last 100 years.

== Brief history ==
Originally called Journal of Embryology and Experimental Morphology (ISSN 0022-0752) and established in 1953, the journal provided a periodical that would be primarily devoted to morphogenesis.

In 1987, the journal was renamed Development. The journal's full archive from 1953 is available online. Development is now a hybrid journal and publishes 24 issues a year. Content over 12 months old is free to read.

== Scope and content ==
Development publishes original research articles and reports, techniques and resources, reviews, and primers across the spectrum of animal and plant developmental biology.

Topics covered include:

- Stem cells and regeneration
- Nuclear programming
- Evolutionary development
- Systems biology
- Neurobiology
- Regional specification
- Morphogenesis
- Organogenesis
- Evolution of the developmental process
- Aetiology of disease
- Epigenetics
- Plant development
- Reproductive biology
- Musculoskeletal system

The journal operates on a continuous publication model. The final version of record is released online as soon as it is ready.

== Abstracting and indexing ==
Development is abstracted and/or indexed by:

- BIOBASE
- CAB abstracts
- Cambridge Scientific Abstracts
- Current Content
- EMBASE
- ISI Web of Science
- Medline
- Scopus

Development is a signatory of the San Francisco Declaration on Research Assessment (DORA).

== the Node ==
the Node is an online community that was launched by Development in 2010. It is a place for developmental and stem cell biologists to share news and information about the field. Anyone in the community can create an account and contribute.

== Journal management ==
=== Past editors ===
Journal of Embryology and Experimental Morphology

- 1953–1978: Michael Abercrombie
- 1979–1982: R. J. Cole, R. L. Gardner, R. M. Gaze, P. A. Lawrence
- 1983–1987: R. L. Gardner, R. M. Gaze, P. A. Lawrence, H. R. Woodland

Development

- 1987–2002: Chris Wylie
- 2003–2009: Jim Smith
- 2010–2018: Olivier Pourquie
- Since 2019: James Briscoe
