= Ralph G. Dacey =

Neurosurgeon and entrepreneur

Ralph G. Dacey Jr.
- Education: Harvard University (BA); University of Virginia (MD)
- Occupations: Neurosurgeon, academic physician
- Employer: Washington University School of Medicine in St. Louis
- Known for: Cerebrovascular neurosurgery
- Awards: AANS Distinguished Service Award (2013); Walter Reed Distinguished Achievement Award (2015); Harvey Cushing Medal (2016)

Ralph G. Dacey Jr. is an American neurosurgeon and academic physician. He was the chair of the Department of Neurological Surgery at Washington University School of Medicine in St. Louis from 1989 through 2019 and has continued as professor of neurological surgery.

== Education and career ==
Dacey received a BA from Harvard University in 1970 and an MD from the University of Virginia in 1974. He completed residency training in internal medicine at Strong Memorial Hospital and in surgery and neurosurgery at the University of Virginia, where he also worked as chief resident in neurosurgery in 1983. Before joining Washington University, he worked as chief of neurosurgery at the University of North Carolina at Chapel Hill.

His clinical work has included intracranial aneurysms, subarachnoid hemorrhage, arteriovenous malformations, carotid stenosis, cavernous malformation, pituitary tumors, meningioma, and other brain tumors. His Washington University profile lists research interests including intracerebral microcirculation, colloid cysts of the third ventricle, three-dimensional shape analysis of intracranial aneurysms, and intra-operative imaging in neurosurgery.

== Professional leadership ==
Dacey worked as president of the Congress of Neurological Surgeons in 1995 and as president of the Society of Neurological Surgeons in 2012–13.

He also worked in accreditation leadership for graduate medical education. The ACGME's 2010 annual report listed him as chair of the Review Committee for Neurological Surgery and as a member of the Council of Review Committees' Quality Care and Professionalism Task Force, and the 2011 annual report listed his chair term as ending June 30, 2011.

== Honors and recognition ==
Dacey was elected to the Institute of Medicine of the National Academy of Sciences in 2010.

In 2013, he received an Honorary Fellowship of the Royal College of Surgeons in Ireland and the American Association of Neurological Surgeons Distinguished Service Award.

In 2015, he received the Walter Reed Distinguished Achievement Award from the UVA Medical Alumni Association. In 2016, he received the Harvey Cushing Medal from the American Association of Neurological Surgeons.

The Ralph G. Dacey Jr., MD, Medal for Outstanding Cerebrovascular Research was established by the AANS/CNS Cerebrovascular Section. The Neurosurgery Research & Education Foundation also maintains the Ralph G. Dacey Fund to support the Ralph Dacey Cerebrovascular Research Lectureship at the AANS/CNS Cerebrovascular Section annual meeting. Washington University also presents the Dr. Ralph G. Dacey Neurosurgeon Scholar Award.

== Publications ==
The Neurosurgery Research & Education Foundation states that Dacey has authored more than 230 publications. In 2025, he was listed with Peter Nakaji and Thomas Beaumont on the book Colloid Cysts of the Third Ventricle: Natural History, Decision-Making, and Operative Management published by Georg Thieme Verlag.

A 2025 second edition of the department history of Washington University's neurosurgery department, authored by Robert Grubb, described the department's growth and advancements under Dacey's leadership.

== Later career ==
In his later career, Dacey has also contributed to the development of BioActive Technology, a subsidiary of Industrial Polymers & Chemicals (IPAC) created in 2025 to commercialize bioactive air-filtration technology. BioActive Technology's company materials describe the IPAC development team as being led by CEO Susan Dacey, with contributions from Ralph G. Dacey Jr., Joan Dacey-Seib, Robert M. Roth, and Thomas J. Kennedy.

Industrial Polymers & Chemicals states that the company was founded in 1959 by Ralph Dacey and that Susan Dacey continues the family legacy as chief executive officer.
