= The Journal of Experimental Biology =

Journal of Experimental Biology
- Cover of Volume 225 Issue 6 from March 2022
- Discipline: Comparative physiology, integrative biology
- Language: English
- Edited by: Craig E. Franklin (University of Queensland, Australia)

Publication details
- Former name: The British Journal of Experimental Biology
- History: 1923-present
- Publisher: The Company of Biologists (United Kingdom)
- Frequency: 24/year
- Open access: Hybrid After 12 months
- Impact factor: 2.8 (2022)

Standard abbreviations
- ISO 4: J. Exp. Biol.

Indexing
- ISSN: 0022-0949 (print); 1477-9145 (web)
- OCLC no.: 1754580

Links
- Journal homepage; Online access; Issue archive

Journal of Experimental Biology (formerly The British Journal of Experimental Biology) is a peer-reviewed scientific journal in the field of comparative physiology and integrative biology. It is published by The Company of Biologists. The journal is part of the Review Commons initiative, is integrated with bioRxiv for co-submission and is partnered with the Web of Science Reviewer Recognition Service (previously Publons ). Journal of Experimental Biology is now a hybrid journal and publishes 24 issues a year. Content over 12 months old is free to read.

== History ==
The British Journal of Experimental Biology was established in Edinburgh in 1923 (Br. J. Exp. Biol.: ISSN 0366-0788). It was published by Oliver and Boyd and edited by F. A. E. Crew with an Editorial Board of nine members, including Julian Huxley. When the journal ran into financial trouble, George Parker Bidder II, the founder of The Company of Biologists, rescued it in 1925. Sir James Gray was appointed as the journal's first Editor-in-Chief in 1925 and the journal was renamed The Journal of Experimental Biology in 1929 (ISSN 0022-0949).

The journal has published ground-breaking work in the areas of biomechanics, skin transplantation and neurophysiology, and has published work by Nobel Prize winners Peter Medawar and August Krogh.

Journal content from 1923 is available online via the journal website. Content over 12 months old is freely available, and authors may choose to make their article Open Access by paying a subsidised fee. All journal content is freely available to community members in developing countries through the Health InterNetwork Access to Research Initiative.

In 2009, Journal of Experimental Biology was included in the School Library Association's top 100 journals in Biology and Medicine over the last 100 years.

== Scope and content ==
Journal of Experimental Biology publishes original research articles, methods and techniques, and reviews in the field of comparative physiology.

The journal currently publishes papers on a wide range of subjects from biomechanics and metabolic physiology, to neurophysiology and neuroethology. Besides peer-reviewed research, the journal features additional material such as "Inside JEB", which provides information about some of each issue's content, "Outside JEB", which discusses literature published in other journals, "JEB Classics", which revisit key papers published in the journal's history, and "Commentaries", which review topics of current interest.

The journal operates on a continuous publication model. The final version of record is released online as soon as it is ready.

== Abstracting and indexing ==
Journal of Experimental Biology is abstracted and/or indexed by:

- BIOBASE
- CAB abstracts
- Cambridge Scientific Abstracts
- Current Contents
- EMBASE
- Web of Science
- Medline
- Scopus

Journal of Experimental Biology is a signatory of the San Francisco Declaration on Research Assessment (DORA).

== Journal management ==
Since the journal's establishment in 1923, there have been seven Editors-in-Chief:

- 1926-1955: Sir James Gray
- 1952-1974: J. A. Ramsay
- 1955-1974: Sir Vincent Wigglesworth
- 1974-1989: John Treherne
- 1989-1994: Charlie Ellington
- 1994-2003: Bob Boutilier
- 2004-2020: Hans Hoppeler (University of Bern, Switzerland)
- 2020 onwards: Craig Franklin (University of Queensland, Australia)
