= George Parker Bidder Jr. =

British barrister

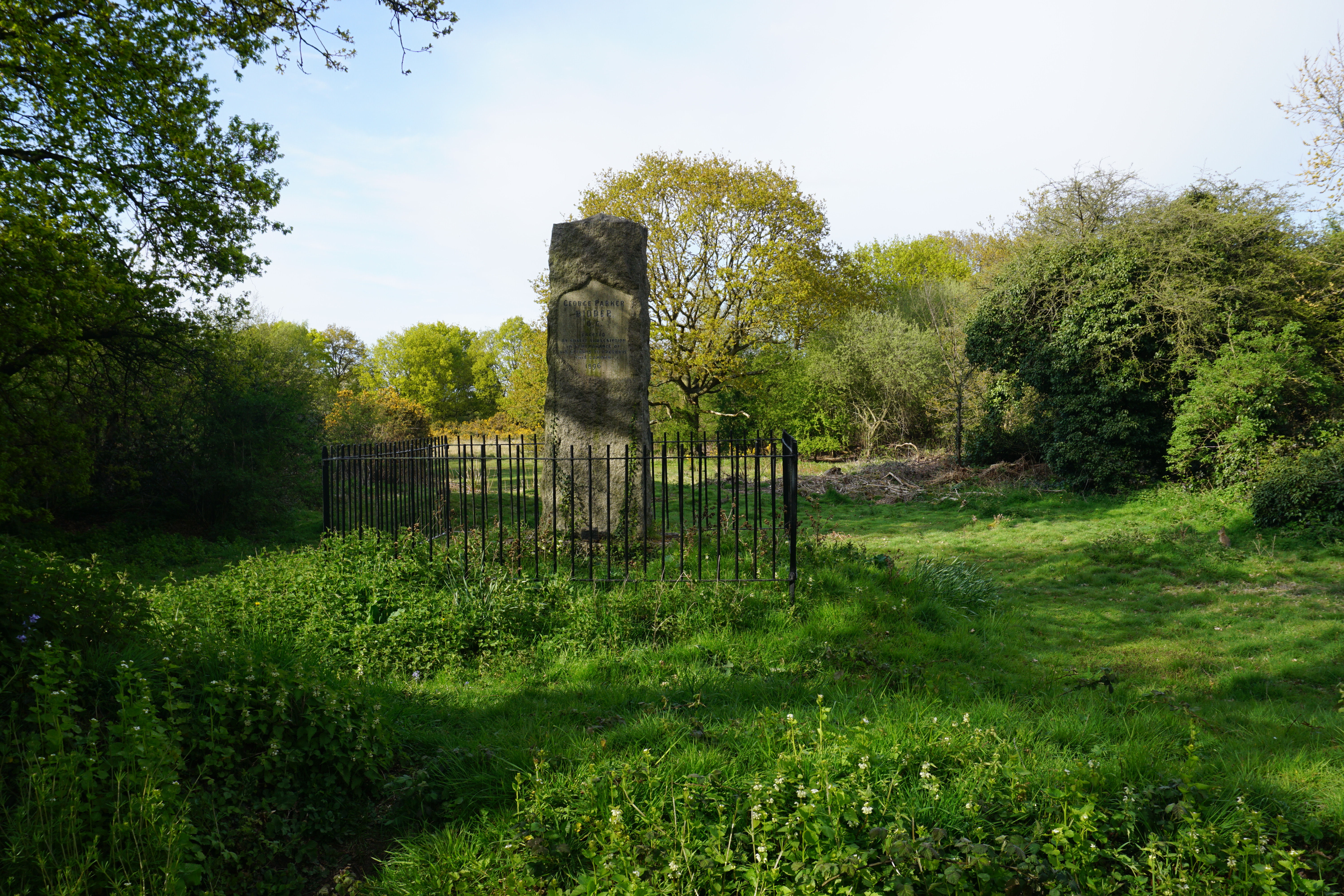
Monument to George Parker Bidder QC on Mitcham Common

George Parker Bidder Jr., QC (August 18, 1836 – February 1, 1896) was a British barrister who represented many water companies against the London County Council.

== Early life and education ==
Bidder was born to George Parker Bidder a civil engineer and mathematics prodigy, known in his youth as the "calculating boy". He was educated at King's College School in Wimbledon, the University of Edinburgh, where her studied under Professor Philip Kelland, and Trinity College, Cambridge.

== Career ==
After graduating in 1858, Bidder was called to the bar in 1860 at Lincoln’s Inn, and was appointed Queen's Counsel in 1874.

With his family background in engineering, many of his cases related construction and infrastructure, with clients including the Midland Railway Company, the London Brighton Railway, and the Mersey Docks and Harbour Company. In the inquiry into the Tay Bridge disaster he defended the reputation of its engineer, Sir Thomas Bouch.

He served on Surrey County Council as the representative for Mitcham, and as a Surrey J.P. Bidder was instrumental in passing the Metropolitan Commons (Mitcham) Act of 1891, which led to the creation of a Board of Conservators with the authority to manage Mitcham Common and preserve its natural features. There is a Grade II listed memorial to him on Mitcham Common, erected by public subscription in remembrance of his efforts to preserve the Common.

== Personal life ==
Bidder married Anna McClean (1839–1910), a daughter of John Robinson McClean. Their son, also named George Parker Bidder, was a marine biologist.

Bidder lived at Ravensbury Park House, which he received from his father in 1877. He died at Queen Anne's Mansions, Westminster, in 1896. He is buried along with his wife at Kensal Green Cemetery.
