= George Parker Bidder (engineer) =

British engineer (1806–1878)

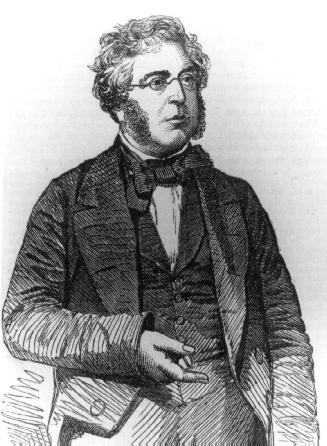
- George Parker Bidder, drawn in the Illustrated London News of March 1856
- Born: 13 June 1806; Moretonhampstead, Devon
- Died: 20 September 1878 (aged 72); Dartmouth, Devon
- Engineering career
- Discipline: civil engineer
- Institutions: Institution of Civil Engineers (president)
- Practice name: Electric Telegraph Company
- Significant design: Royal Victoria Dock

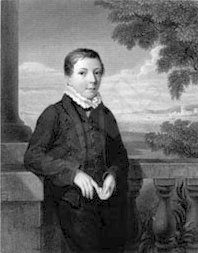
George Parker Bidder as a "calculating boy"

George Parker Bidder (13 June 1806 – 20 September 1878) was an English engineer and calculating prodigy.

== Early life ==
Born in the town of Moretonhampstead, Devon, England, he displayed a natural skill at calculation from an early age. In childhood, his father, William Bidder, a stonemason, exhibited him as a "calculating boy", first in local fairs up to the age of six, and later around the country. In this way his talent was turned to profitable account, but his general education was in danger of being completely neglected.

Still, many of those who saw him developed an interest in his education, a notable example being Sir John Herschel. His interest led him to arrange it so George could be sent to school in Camberwell. There he did not remain long, being removed by his father, who wished to exhibit him again, but he was saved from this misfortune and enabled to attend classes at the University of Edinburgh, largely through the kindness of Sir Henry Jardine, to whom he subsequently showed his gratitude by founding a "Jardine Bursary" at the university.

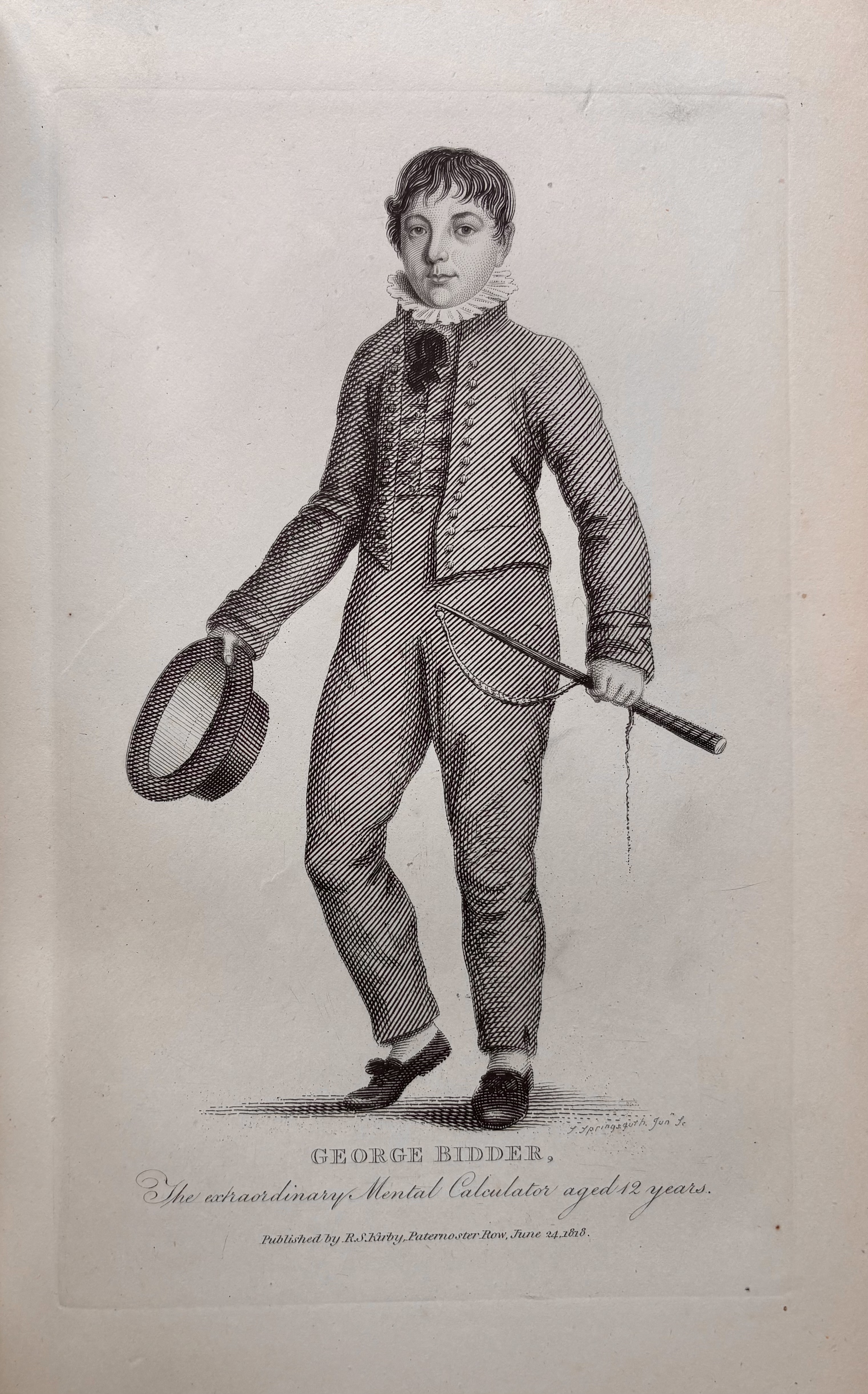
An engraving of George Bidder, the "Calculating Boy" aged 12.

== Career ==
On leaving college in 1824, George received a post in the ordnance survey, but gradually drifted into engineering work. In 1834 Robert Stephenson, whose acquaintance he had made in Edinburgh, offered him an appointment on the London & Birmingham Railway, and in the succeeding year or two he began to assist George Stephenson in his parliamentary work, which at that time included schemes for railways between London and Brighton and between Manchester and Rugby via the Potteries. In this way he was introduced to engineering and parliamentary practice at a period of great activity which saw the establishment of the main features and principles that have since governed English railway construction.

He has been praised as the best witness that ever entered a committee-room. He was quick to discover and take advantage of the weak points in an opponent's case, and his powers of mental calculation frequently stood him in good stead, as when, for example, an apparently casual glance at the plans of a railway enabled him to point out errors in the engineering data that were sufficient to secure rejection of the scheme to which he was opposed. In consequence, there was scarcely an engineering proposal of any importance brought before Parliament in connexion with which his services were not secured by one party or the other.

=== Railway engineering ===
On the constructive side of his profession he was also busily occupied. In 1837 he was engaged with R. Stephenson in building the Blackwall railway, and it was he who designed the peculiar method of disconnecting a carriage at each station while the rest of the train went on without stopping, which was employed in the early days of that line when it was worked by means of a cable. Another series of railways with which he had much to do were those in the eastern counties which afterwards became the Great Eastern system.

He also advised on the construction of the Belgian railways; with R. Stephenson he made the first railway in Norway, from Christiania to Eidsvold; he was engineer-in-chief of the Danish railways, and he was largely concerned with railways in India, where he strongly and successfully opposed break of gauge on through routes.

=== Institution of Civil Engineers ===
Though he sometimes spoke of himself as a mere "railway-engineer," he was in reality very much more; there was indeed no branch of engineering in which he did not take an interest, as was shown by the assiduity with which for half a century he attended the weekly meetings of the Institution of Civil Engineers, of which he was elected president in 1860.

=== Introduction of the electric telegraph ===
He was "one of the first to recognize the value of the electric telegraph." That invention was in its infancy when, in 1837, jointly with R. Stephenson, he recommended its introduction on a portion of the London & Birmingham and on the Blackwall lines, while three years later he advised that it should be adopted to facilitate the working of the single line between Norwich and Yarmouth. He was also one of the founders of the Electric Telegraph Company, which enabled the public generally to enjoy the benefits of telegraphic communication.

=== Royal Victoria Docks ===
In hydraulic engineering, he was the designer of the Victoria Docks (London), being responsible not only for their construction, but also for what was regarded by some people at the time as the foolish idea of utilizing the Essex marshes for dock accommodation on a large scale. His advice was frequently sought by the government on points both of naval and military engineering.

=== Steam trawlers ===
Bidder also investigated the practicality of steam trawlers in conjunction with Samuel Lake, also of Dartmouth, and proved to be a technical success, but not at that time to be commercially viable.

== Death ==
Bidder died at his residence of Ravensbury Dartmouth, Devon, aged 72, on 20 September 1878 and was buried at Stoke Fleming in St Peter's Church.

== Family ==
His sister Ann (died 1844) was married to painter Jacob Thompson. His son, George Parker Bidder Jr. (1836–1896), who inherited much of his father's calculating power, was a successful parliamentary counsel and an authority on cryptography. His grandson, also named George Parker Bidder, became a marine biologist and president of the Marine Biological Association of the United Kingdom from 1939 to 1945.

== Posthumous accolades ==
He was placed second in a book on The Great Mental Calculators, just behind Jacques Inaudi.

In late 2020, a statue was erected in the centre of Moretonhampstead to commemorate Bidder.

Professional and academic associations
Preceded by Joseph Locke	President of the Institution of Civil Engineers; December 1859 – December 1861	Succeeded by John Hawkshaw
