= McDonnell Genome Institute =

Sequencing centre in St. Louis, Missouri

Coordinates: 38°38′13.7″N 90°15′24.8″W

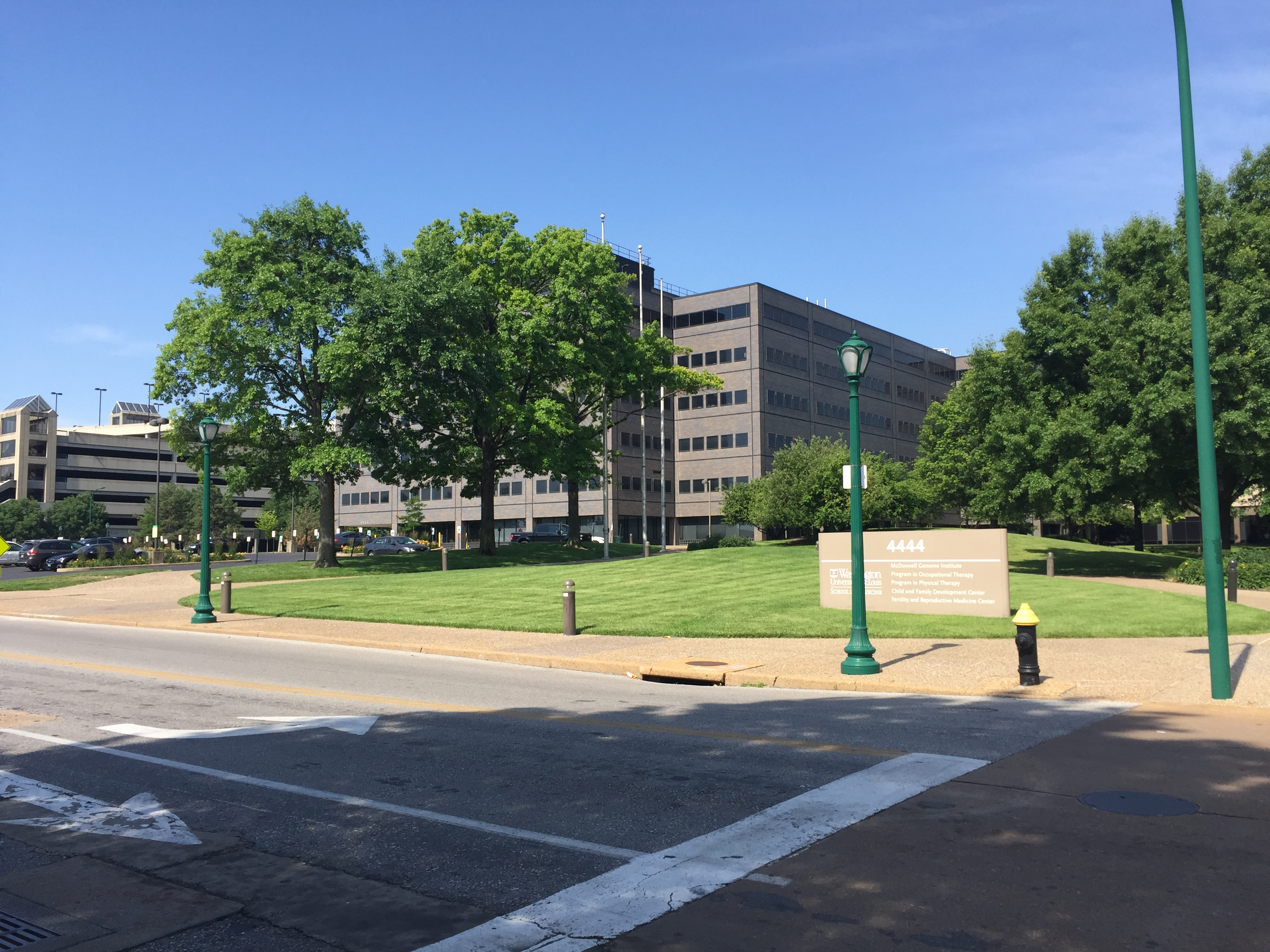
- Established: 1993
- Field of research: Genomics; Bioinformatics
- Director: Jeffrey Milbrandt
- Location: St. Louis, Missouri
- Affiliations: Washington University School of Medicine
- Website: genome.wustl.edu

McDonnell Genome Institute (The Elizabeth H. and James S. McDonnell III Genome Institute) at Washington University in St. Louis, Missouri, is one of three NIH funded large-scale sequencing centers in the United States. Affiliated with Washington University School of Medicine and the Alvin J. Siteman Cancer Center, the McDonnell Genome Institute is creating, testing and implementing new approaches to the study of genomics with the goal of understanding human health and disease, as well as evolution and the biology of other organisms.

== History ==
Founded in 1993, the McDonnell Genome Institute, formerly the Genome Sequencing Center and The Genome Institute, began as a key player in the Human Genome Project, ultimately contributing more than 25 percent of the finished sequence. Following completion of the working draft of the human genome in 2000, and the finished human genome sequence in 2003, McDonnell Genome Institute turned its sequencing and analysis skills to determining the genomes of many other organisms in order to provide the first reference sequences for these species. In 2014, civic leaders and longtime philanthropists Elizabeth H. and James S. McDonnell III pledged $25 million to The Genome Institute, which was renamed the Elizabeth H. and James S. McDonnell III Genome Institute at Washington University.

== Projects ==
- The Cancer Genome Atlas compares DNA sequences of adult cancer patients and their tumors to identify the genetic changes important to cancer.
- Human Microbiome Project is sequencing the genomes of microbes involved in human health and disease.
- 1000 Genomes Project seeks to catalog the immense human variation written into the genetic code.
- Washington University Cancer Genome Initiative provides for hundreds of tumor and normal sample genomes to be sequenced.
- Pediatric Cancer Genome Project is a collaboration with St. Jude Children's Research Hospital to identify the genetic changes that give rise to some of the world's deadliest childhood cancers.
- Medical Sequencing targets sequences from diseases such as metabolic syndromes and vision-related disorders to help individualize patient treatment.

== Staff ==
McDonnell Genome Institute employs over 300 full-time faculty and staff from a variety of disciplines. Core staff include:

Jeffrey Milbrandt, MD, PhD: Dr. Milbrandt is the Executive Director of the McDonnell Genome Institute.

== Activities ==
Whole Genome Re-sequencing: The Whole Genome Re-sequencing Group focuses on developing and optimizing sample intake, production 'sequencing, and sequence analysis pipelines for human disease genomic research, with a major emphasis on cancer.

De Novo Assembly: The De Novo Assembly Group is responsible for taking the sequenced pieces of various species' genomes and putting them together as contiguously and accurately as possible.

Microbial Genomics: The Microbial Genomics Group represents a range of activities from sequencing individual bacteria to population genomics studies of microbial species to analysis of complex metagenomic samples.

Targeted Re-sequencing: The Targeted Re-sequencing Group sequences specific regions of genomes using several different methods including PCR as well as hybrid selection techniques.

Transcriptomes: The Transcriptomes Group works on the various aspects of sequencing and analysis of transcriptomes, based on next-generation sequencing of RNA.

== Data ==
The McDonnell Genome Institute makes all sequence data available to the research community, pending appropriate quality analysis. Some of this data is preliminary and is subject to omissions and errors. Data also changes based on the availability of new data and assembly versions.

As per the NHGRI's data release policy, all users must acknowledge the McDonnell Genome Institute as the data source.

== Outreach ==
McDonnell Genome Institute's Outreach Department was established in 2003 in response to the National Human Genome Research Institute's Minority Action Plan. Since its inception, Outreach has conducted activities that serve to educate K-12 students and the community at large regarding genomics and the role the McDonnell Genome Institute plays in this field. Outreach has hosted thousands of patrons through tours, presentations, science fairs and various off-site visits. The department established Opportunities in Genomics Research whose purpose is to increase the number of underrepresented minorities who obtain Ph.D.s in the field of genomics/genetics. Two programs have been implemented under OGR, which provide research opportunities for undergraduates (Undergraduate Scholars) and recent college graduates (Extensive Study).

== Facilities ==
The McDonnell Genome Institute is located on the Washington University School of Medicine campus in St. Louis, Missouri, at 4444 Forest Park Avenue. It is accessible by Metrolink (Central West End Station).

The McDonnell Genome Institute has a separate data center located across the street at 222 Newstead Avenue. The $20 million, 16,000 square-foot data center was built with fully redundant power and cooling systems capable of housing over 100 racks of high-density computation and storage systems.

The McDonnell Genome Institute's data center is the first "green" building on the School of Medicine's campus and has received the Leadership in Energy and Environmental Design (LEED) Gold status by the U.S. Green Building Council. The data center also houses a legacy 1,200-square-foot (110 m^{2}) server room equipped with raised floors, redundant power and cooling.
