= George Parker Bidder (marine biologist) =

British marine biologist

- Born: 21 May 1863; London, UK
- Died: 31 December 1953 (aged 90); Cambridge, UK
- Education: Trinity College, Cambridge
- Known for: Sponges; Bidder's hypothesis
- Spouse: Marion Greenwood
- Children: 2
- Scientific career
- Fields: Marine biology
- Workplaces: Marine Biological Association; The Company of Biologists

George Parker Bidder (21 May 1863 – 31 December 1953) was a British marine biologist who primarily studied sponges. He was the President of the Marine Biological Association (MBA) from 1939 to 1945.

== Life and career ==
George Parker Bidder was born on 21 May 1863 in London, to barrister George Parker Bidder Jr. (1836–1896) and Anna McClean (1839–1910). His paternal grandfather was George Parker Bidder, an engineer and calculating prodigy, and his maternal grandfather was John Robinson McClean, a civil engineer and member of the Liberal Party. Bidder went to King's Preparatory School in Brighton and Harrow School. He then studied zoology at University College London under Ray Lankester for one year before joining Trinity College, Cambridge, where he took the Natural Sciences Tripos until 1886. In 1887 he began working at the Stazione Zoologica in Naples, Italy. He joined the MBA in 1893, becoming a member of the council (its governing body) in 1899. The same year he married Marion Greenwood and moved to Plymouth, where they stayed until 1902, when they moved to Cambridge. They had two daughters; one, Anna McClean Bidder (1903–2001), was a zoologist and academic.

During the 1910s, Bidder suffered tuberculosis, which made him unable to work at the laboratory or take part in the First World War. In 1925, Bidder founded The Company of Biologists to save The British Journal of Experimental Biology from bankruptcy.

Bidder died on 31 December 1953 in Cambridge.

== Research ==
Bidder's research focused on sponges, especially their hydraulics. He also studied the movements bottom feeders, as well as marine geology, in particular coastal erosion.

In 1932, Bidder made a major contribution to the field of biogerontology by proposing that senescence was the effect of a "regulator" responsible for ending growth. This theory, known as "Bidder's hypothesis" has been refuted in numerous experiments, starting with Alex Comfort's 1963 study on guppy, a species that ages while growing. Nonetheless, Bidder's hypothesis might be true for some species as a "private" mechanism of ageing.

Between 1904 and 1906, Bidder conducted research that proved the East-to-West flow of North Sea currents, by releasing some 1,000 messages in bottles, designed to float a short distance above the sea bed. Finders were requested, in English, Dutch and German, to send a postcard enclosed in the bottle to the United Kingdom's Marine Biological Association in Plymouth, for a shilling reward. The majority were recovered just a few months later, but one was found on the German island of Amrum, as late as April 2015, and its postcard was duly returned to the MBA. Guinness World Records confirmed it to be the "oldest message in a bottle", as of March 2016. (Note: There are now known message-in-a-bottle examples that are both older (date launched) and having longer duration (time between launch and recovery); see Message in a bottle#Long-duration events.)

== Poetry ==
From his youth, Bidder dedicated much of his free time to writing poems, the most famous of which is "Merlin's Youth" (1899).
