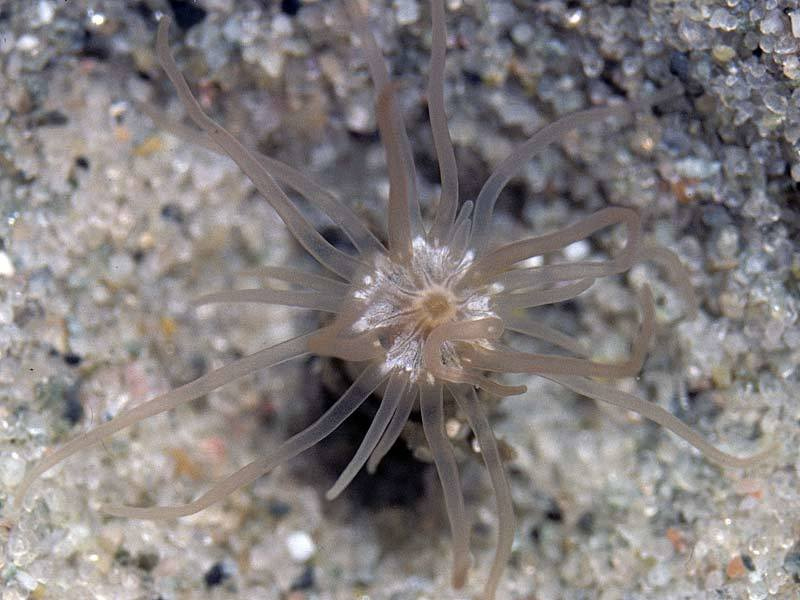

Scientific classification
- Domain: Eukaryota
- Kingdom: Animalia
- Phylum: Cnidaria
- Subphylum: Anthozoa
- Class: Hexacorallia
- Order: Actiniaria
- Family: Edwardsiidae
- Genus: Edwardsia
- Species: E. timida

Binomial name
- Edwardsia timida de Quatrefages, 1842

Synonyms
- List: Edwardsia callianthus Rawlinson, 1935; Edwardsia harassei Quatrefages, 1842; Edwardsia harassi Quatrefages, 1842; Edwardsia harassii Quatrefages, 1842; Edwardsiella dixoni; Edwardsiella harassii Quatrefages, 1842; Edwardsiella timida Quatrefages, 1842; Edwardsioides timida (Quatrefages, 1842); Fagesia dixoni (Carlgren, 1921); Milne-Edwardsia dixonii (Carlgren, 1921); Milne dixoni Carlgren

= Edwardsia timida =

Species of sea anemone

Edwardsia timida, also known as the timid burrowing anemone, is a species of sea anemone in the family Edwardsiidae.

== Description ==
This species of sea anemone has a maximum diameter of 5 mm (0.20 in) and maximum length of 7 cm (2.8 in); it is similar to Edwardsia claparedii but even more elongate, with a translucent pale orange colour. It has 16–32 tentacles arranged in 3 cycles, with 4 larger tentacles in the primary cycle. Its column is slender, without tubercles. It has cinclides (pores in the body wall for release of water and cnidocytes).

== Distribution and habitat ==
Edwardsia timida is found in the Irish Sea and English Channel. It is one of 943 species listed by Natural England in 2014 as species of principal importance for the conservation of biodiversity in England.

Edwardsia timida burrows in sand or gravel from lower shore to shallow sublittoral.
