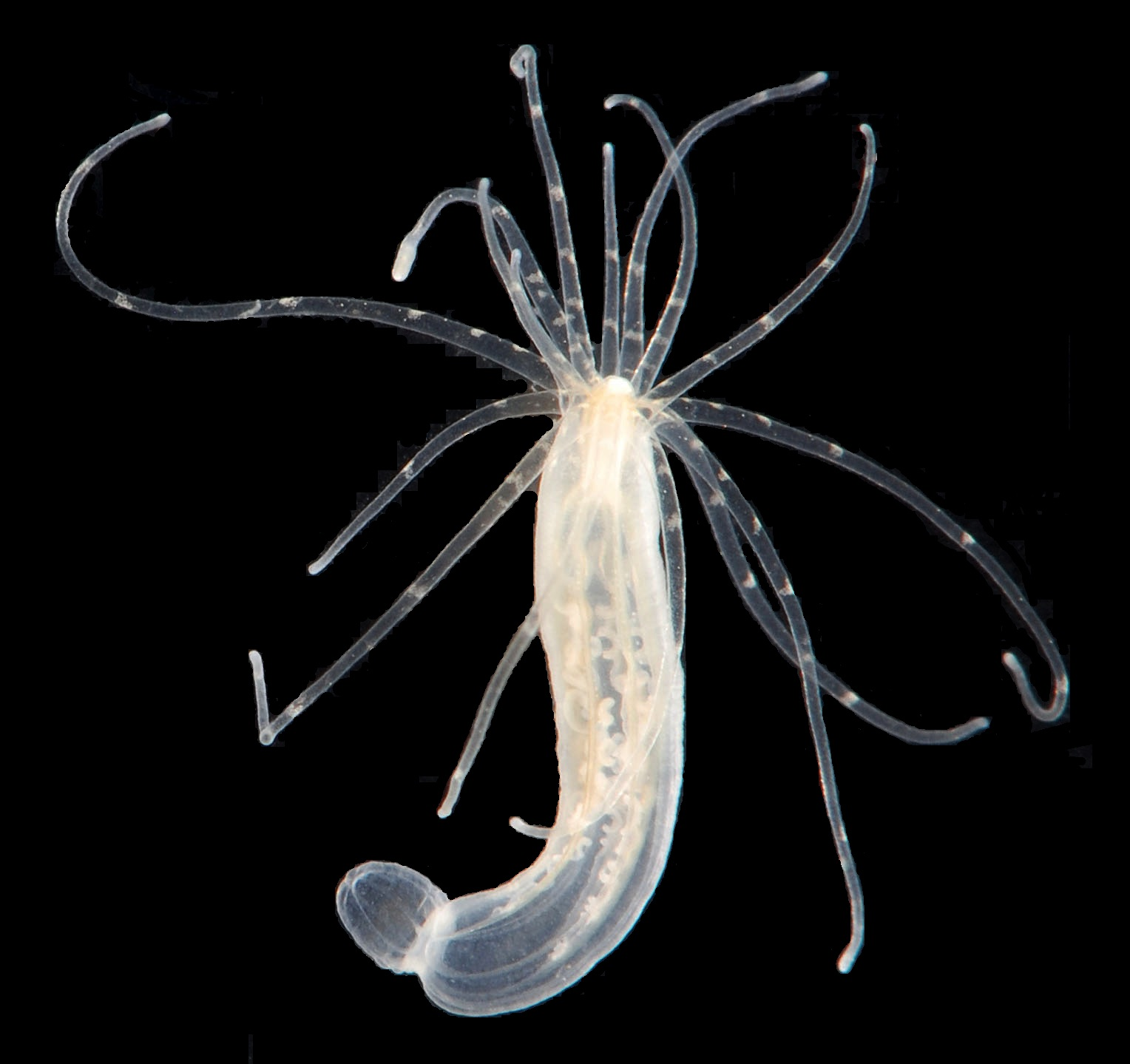

Conservation status
- Vulnerable (IUCN 2.3)

Scientific classification
- Kingdom: Animalia
- Phylum: Cnidaria
- Subphylum: Anthozoa
- Class: Hexacorallia
- Order: Actiniaria
- Family: Edwardsiidae
- Genus: Nematostella
- Species: N. vectensis

Binomial name
- Nematostella vectensis Stephenson, 1935

Synonyms
- Nematostella pellucida

= Starlet sea anemone =

Species of sea anemone

The starlet sea anemone (Nematostella vectensis) is a species of small sea anemone in the family Edwardsiidae native to the east coast of the United States, with introduced populations along the coast of southeast England and the west coast of the United States (class Anthozoa, phylum Cnidaria, a sister group of Bilateria). Populations have also been located in Nova Scotia, Canada. This sea anemone is found in the shallow brackish water of coastal lagoons and salt marshes where its slender column is usually buried in the mud and its tentacles exposed. Its genome has been sequenced and it is cultivated in the laboratory as a model organism, but the IUCN has listed it as being a "Vulnerable species" in the wild.

== Description ==
The starlet sea anemone has a bulbous basal end and a contracting column that ranges in length from less than 2 to 6 cm (0.8 to 2.4 in). There is a fairly distinct division between the scapus, the main part of the column, and the capitulum, the part just below the crown of tentacles. The outer surface of the column has a loose covering of mucus to which particles of sediment tend to adhere. At the top of the column is an oral disk containing the mouth surrounded by two rings of long slender tentacles. Typically there are fourteen but sometimes as many as twenty tentacles, the outermost being longer than the inner whorl. The starlet sea anemone is translucent and largely colourless but usually has a pattern of white markings on the column and white banding on the tentacles.

== Distribution and habitat ==
The starlet sea anemone occurs on the eastern and westward seaboard of North America. Its range extends from Nova Scotia to Louisiana on the east coast and from Washington to California on the west coast. It is also known from three locations in the United Kingdom—two in East Anglia and one on the Isle of Wight. Its typical habitat is brackish ponds, brackish lagoons and ditches and pools in salt marshes. It is found in positions with little water flow and seldom occurs more than one metre (yard) below the surface. It can tolerate a wide range of salinities, 2 to 52 parts per thousand in southern England, and seems to breed best at around 11 parts per thousand. It is typically buried up to the crown in fine silt or sand, with its tentacles flared out on the surface of the sediment. When not feeding, the tentacles are retracted into the column.

== Ecology ==
The starlet sea anemone sometimes occurs at high densities (as many as 2,700 per square metre has been recorded). Other macrofauna found alongside it in England include the lagoon cockle (Cerastoderma glaucum), the lagoon sandworm Armandia cirrhosa, the isopod Idotea chelipes and the amphipods Monocorophium insidiosum and Gammarus insensibilis. Plants in its habitat include foxtail stonewort, Lamprothamniun papulosum, green algae Chaetomorpha spp., and ditch grass (Ruppia) spp. In North America it is found among the saltmarsh grasses Spartina patens and Spartina alterniflora and the green algae Chaetomorpha spp. and Cladophora.

The starlet sea anemone feeds on ostracods, copepods, small molluscs, chironomid larvae, nematodes, polychaetes, small crustaceans and egg masses. The only known predator of this sea anemone is the grass shrimp Palaemonetes pugio.

== Life cycle ==
On the east coast of the United States, reproduction is mostly by sexual means. The anemones become mature at about three to four months with a column length of 2 cm (0.8 in) or more. Up to two thousand eggs are laid in a gelatinous clump. The spherical planula larvae that hatch about two days later spend around a week in the water column before settling on the sediment and undergoing metamorphosis into juveniles. In southern England all individuals seem to be female and reproduction is by budding. Two-crowned anemones are common in this location and these individuals later undergo fission into separate sea anemones. On the west coast of the United States, all individuals are also female while in Nova Scotia, all are male, and reproduction in both these populations is likely to be by asexual means. In areas of low population density, members of this species are more likely to reproduce asexually via transverse fission, which enables them to maintain and expand their populations under environmental duress and in areas with limited opportunities for sexual reproduction.

== Research ==
Cnidarians are the simplest animals in which the cells are organized into tissues. Specialist cells include epithelial cells, neurons, muscle fibres and stem cells, and there is a complex extracellular matrix. Nematostella vectensis is used as a model organism for the study of evolution, genomics, reproductive biology, developmental biology and ecology. It is easy to care for in the laboratory, even in inland locations, and a protocol has been developed for the induction of gametogenesis which can yield large numbers of embryos on a daily basis. Its genome has been sequenced. Analysis of expressed sequence tags and the whole genome have shown a remarkable degree of similarity in the gene sequence conservation and complexity between the sea anemone and vertebrates. Recent sequencing of its complex genome has shown that it has an estimated complement of 18,000 protein-coding genes. Its repertoire, structure, and organization is very conserved when compared with that of vertebrates but surprisingly different from that of fruit flies and nematodes, which have lost many genes and introns and have experienced genome rearrangements, indicating the genome of their common ancestor also was a complex genome

Researchers at the Sars International Centre for Marine Molecular Biology have found that genes concerned in the formation of the head in higher animals are also present in Nematostella vectensis. The larva swims with the end with its main sense organ in front, and at metamorphosis this end becomes the lower end of the column. The "head" gene is concerned in the development of this lower end rather than the oral crown and tentacles.

Nematostella is a model organism for research because it responds differently to environmental stress and chemical toxins. The anemone's genome encodes a set of genes that help defend against harmful chemicals. This includes cytochrome P450, other oxidases, and ATP-dependent efflux transporters, all of which help detoxify harmful compounds in the organism's environment. The study of these genes is crucial for understanding how aquatic organisms cope with pollutants and toxins amid growing concerns about environmental pollution and its impact on marine ecosystems.
