= Edwardsia allmani =

Scientific classification
- Kingdom: Animalia
- Phylum: Cnidaria
- Subphylum: Anthozoa
- Class: Hexacorallia
- Order: Actiniaria
- Family: Edwardsiidae
- Genus: Edwardsia
- Species: E. allmani

Binomial name
- Edwardsia allmani McIntosh, 1866

Species of sea anemone

Edwardsia allmani is a species of sea anemone in the family Edwardsiidae.

== Distribution ==
It was found in the exclusive economic zone of United Kingdom.
