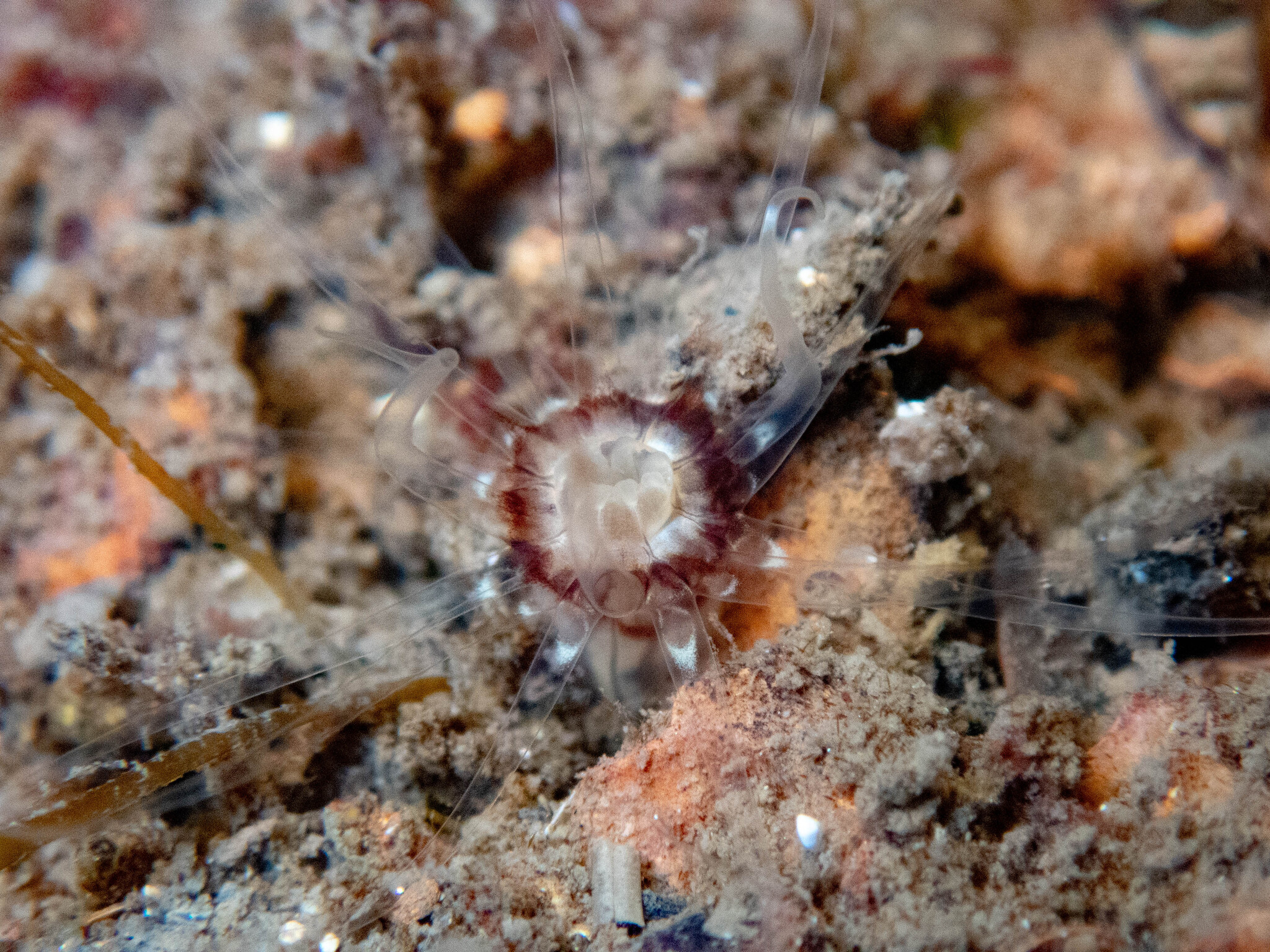

Scientific classification
- Kingdom: Animalia
- Phylum: Cnidaria
- Subphylum: Anthozoa
- Class: Hexacorallia
- Order: Actiniaria
- Family: Edwardsiidae
- Genus: Edwardsia
- Species: E. delapiae

Binomial name
- Edwardsia delapiae Carlgren & Stephenson, 1928

= Edwardsia delapiae =

Species of sea anemone

Edwardsia delapiae is a species of sea anemone which is currently only known from its type locality in south-western Ireland.

== Description ==
This species of sea anemone has an elongated column; divided into scapus and scapulus. There are 16 tentacles arranged in two equal cycles of 8. The tentacles are transparent, with a white ring at the base and sometimes a little white coloration near the tip. Column up to 80 mm in length when fully extended, span of tentacles to 40 mm.

== Range ==
This species is currently only known from Valentia harbour, County Kerry, Ireland.

== Habitat ==
Edwardsia delapiae lives buried in mud and extends its tentacles across the surface of the substrate.

== Etymology ==
This species was named after its discoverer, Maude Delap.
