= Edwarsia =

Edwarsia is an unaccepted scientific name and may refer to two different genera:

- Bidens, a genus of plants
- Edwardsia, a genus of sea anemones
