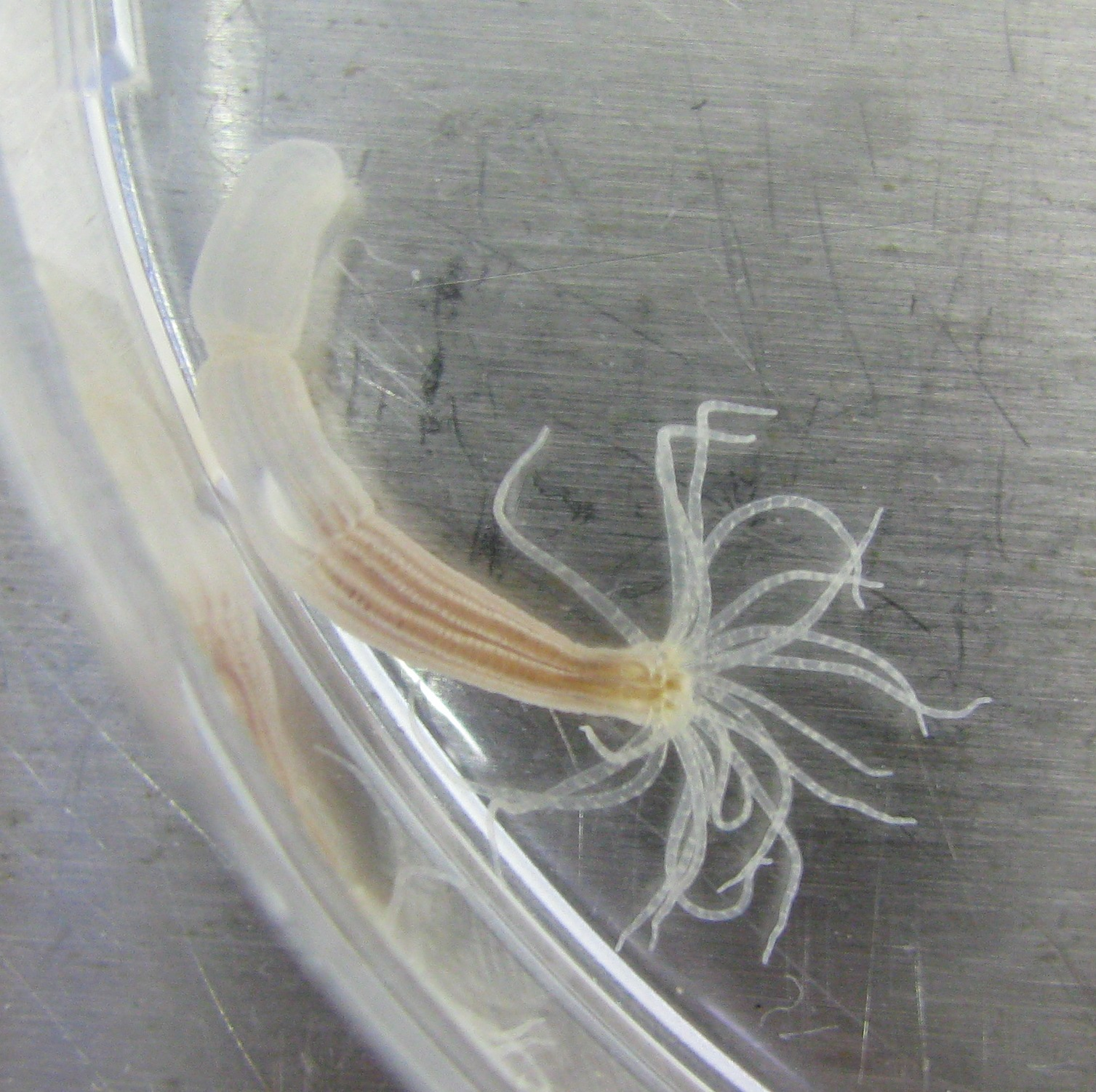
- Starlet sea anemone (Nematostella vectensis)

Scientific classification
- Kingdom: Animalia
- Phylum: Cnidaria
- Subphylum: Anthozoa
- Class: Hexacorallia
- Order: Actiniaria
- Family: Edwardsiidae
- Genus: Nematostella; Stephenson, 1935

Species
- See text

= Nematostella =

Genus of sea anemones

Nematostella is a genus of sea anemones in the family Edwardsiidae. Of the three species in the genus, the best known is the starlet sea anemone (N. vectensis), which has been extensively studied as a model organism in fields such as genetics, evolution, and ecology. The defining morphological apomorphy of Nematostella is the presence of nematosomes. Nematostella are able to reproduce asexually and regenerate from small fragments due to their simple body structure, pluripotent cells, specific genetic mechanisms, and evolutionary adaptations.

Species:

- Nematostella nathorstii (Carlgren, 1921)
- Nematostella polaris (Carlgren, 1921)
- Nematostella vectensis Stephenson, 1935 – starlet sea anemone
