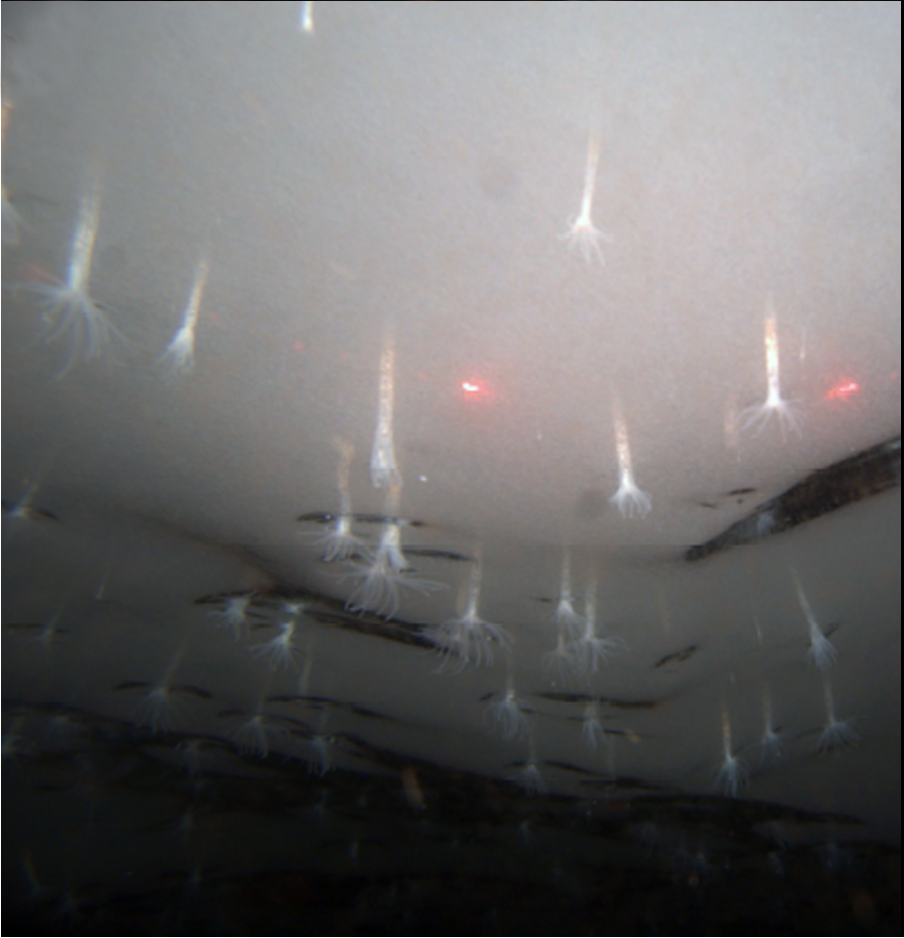

Scientific classification
- Kingdom: Animalia
- Phylum: Cnidaria
- Subphylum: Anthozoa
- Class: Hexacorallia
- Order: Actiniaria
- Family: Edwardsiidae
- Genus: Edwardsiella
- Species: E. andrillae

Binomial name
- Edwardsiella andrillae Daly et al., 2013

= Edwardsiella andrillae =

Species of sea anemone

Edwardsiella andrillae is a species of sea anemone that uniquely lives anchored to the underside of sea ice offshore of Antarctica. It was discovered in December 2010 during a test run of an undersea robot by a team of researchers associated with the Antarctic Geological Drilling (ANDRILL) Program. The newly discovered anemone was named for the aforementioned program.

== Description ==
According to the scientists, the anemones were less than an inch long when contracted, but would feature between twenty and twenty four tentacles and expand out to three to four times their original size when they relaxed. This includes eight longer tentacles placed in a ring around the inside of the animal, and twelve to sixteen on the outer ring.

== Distribution ==
As of January 2014, the anemone has only been spotted under the Ross Ice Shelf.

== Habitat ==
It is unclear how the species attaches itself to the sea ice, as it would be unable to conventionally burrow into it as other members of the family do in sand. It is the only known species of anemone to live in ice. Additionally, scientists are unsure of how the species survives the temperatures without freezing, and their methods of reproduction. It is speculated that the creatures feed on the plankton in the water.

== Discovery ==
The ANDRILL Program was originally on a mission to learn about undersea currents under the Ross Sea. After drilling the hole, the scientists lowered the robot under the ice, when they made the discovery, which was described by Frank Rack of the ANDRILL Science Management Office at the University of Nebraska–Lincoln as "total serendipity." As the team was not originally expecting to find biological life under the shelf, they were not prepared to retrieve or document sea life. In order to retrieve the sea life, they used hot water to stun them, and used an improvised suction device to remove them from their burrows. The specimens were then placed in ethanol due to the team's lack of preservation equipment, and transferred to the McMurdo Station for further study. Additionally, once the specimens arrived at McMurdo, they were placed in formalin.

Due to the discovery of the anemone and the possibility that other life exists under the ice, Rack stated that a proposal is being prepared to further study the environment below the ice. The National Aeronautics and Space Administration is also helping fund the research, as it has implications in the search for life on Jupiter's moon, Europa.

On 23 May 2014 International Institute for Species Exploration declared Edwardsiella andrillae as one of the "Top 10 New Species of 2014" among different species discovered in 2013, chosen for its unique habitat.
