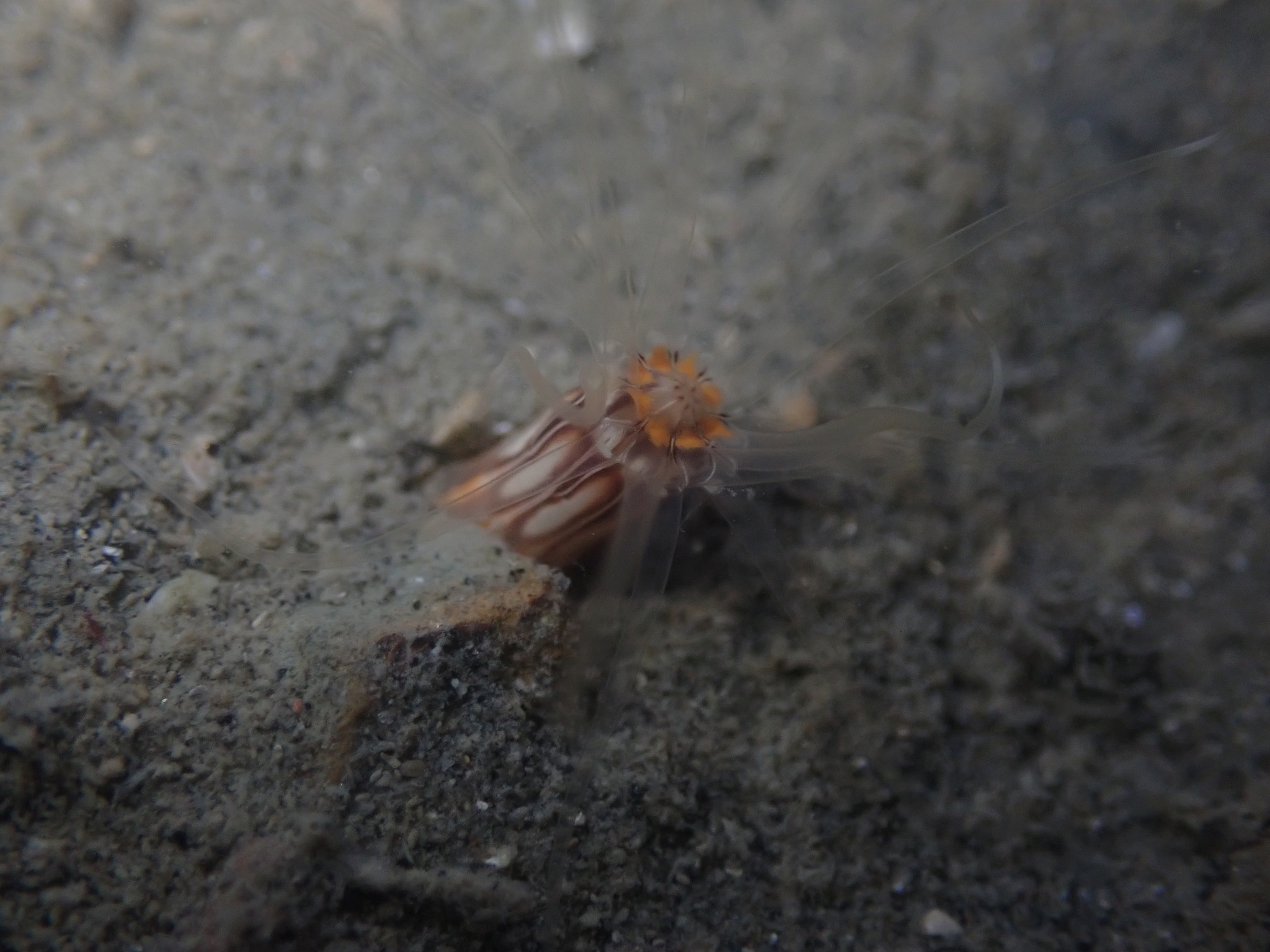

Scientific classification
- Domain: Eukaryota
- Kingdom: Animalia
- Phylum: Cnidaria
- Subphylum: Anthozoa
- Class: Hexacorallia
- Order: Actiniaria
- Family: Edwardsiidae
- Genus: Edwardsia
- Species: E. neozelanica

Binomial name
- Edwardsia neozelanica Farquhar, 1898

Synonyms
- List: Edwardsia ignota Stuckey, 1909; Edwardsia neozealanica; Edwardsia tricolor Farquhar, 1898

= Edwardsia neozelanica =

Species of sea anemone

Edwardsia neozelanica, commonly known as the burrowing anemone, is a small cryptic sea anemone from New Zealand. It burrows into soft mud or sand, and when covered with water extends its tentacles to feed on tiny particles of detritus.

== Distribution and habitat ==
E. neozelanica is found in New Zealand, in intertidal areas such as harbour mouths or rock pools where silt and mud accumulates. Being small and so similar in colour to the substrate it lives in, E. neozelanica is a cryptic species most often found when sand or mud is passed through a fine sieve.

== Description ==
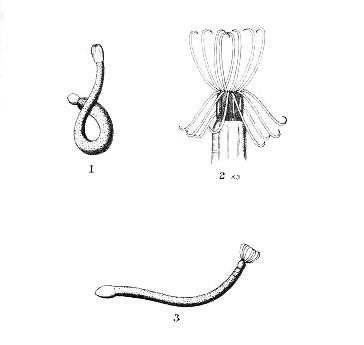
Illustrations of E. neozelanica by Farquhar that accompanied its 1898 description. The tentacle-fringed capitulum and three-part body can be clearly seen.

This tiny anemone has a diameter of just 5 millimetres and a length of 30–50 millimetres. Its long worm-like body is divided into three parts: physa, scapus, and capitulum. The physa is a bulbous bladder-like organ covered with tiny suckers, used in burrowing. The scapus or body column is wrinkly and covered with a rough cuticle that can be brown, grey, or orange in colour, with a narrow neck at the top connecting it to the capitulum or oral end.

E. neozelanica has on its capitulum sixteen or more transparent tentacles, usually in two whorls of eight, that are pinkish white to buff yellow or brown in colour. Each tentacle in the outer whorl corresponds with one of eight brown lines that originate on the scapus as longitudinal double white lines.

== Behaviour and diet ==
This worm-like sea anemone thrusts its body into soft mud or sand before anchoring itself in place by slightly swelling its body column. Only its oral disc and tentacles are visible above the silt. It feeds on organic detritus, extending its fine tentacles across the surface of the sediment.
