= Maude Delap =

Irish marine biologist

- Portrait in 1950
- Born: 7 December 1866; Templecrone Rectory, Dungloe, County Donegal, Ireland
- Died: 23 July 1953 (aged 86); Valentia Island, County Kerry, Ireland
- Relatives: Constance Delap (sister)
- Scientific career
- Fields: Natural history; marine biology

Maude Jane Delap (7 December 1866 – 23 July 1953) was a self-taught Irish naturalist and marine biologist active on Valentia Island. Delap is known for being the first person to breed jellyfish in captivity and was one of the first to identity their life cycle. In collaboration with her sister Constance, Delap was involved in the extensive study of plankton from the coasts of Valentia Island.

== Early life and education ==
Delap was born on 7 December 1866 at Templecrone Rectory, Dungloe to The Rev Alexander Delap and Anna Jane Delap (née Goslett). The seventh of ten siblings, Delap was the elder sister of the marine biologist Constance Delap. In 1874, when Maude was aged 8, the family moved to Valentia Island when her father became the rector of the island and Cahirciveen. Maude and her sisters received very little formal education in contrast to their brothers, though they benefited from some progressive primary school teaching. Maude and her sister Constance were encouraged in their interest in zoology and biology from their father, who himself published notes in The Irish Naturalist and elsewhere.

== Collecting and research ==
Maude, and her sister Constance, were prolific collectors of marine specimens many of which are now housed within the collections of the Natural History Museum, Dublin. Based on their work a survey was undertaken by the Royal Irish Academy headed by Edward T. Browne of University College London in 1895 and 1896, a precursor to the Clare Island Survey. Following this collaboration Maude and Constance continued to collect specimens through dredging and tow-netting as well as recording sea temperature and changes in marine life. Maude kept in correspondence with Browne, sending specimens and drawings, until his death in 1937.

Delap became increasingly interested in the life cycle of various species of jellyfish, being the first person to successfully breed them in captivity in her home laboratory using home made aquariums. She bred Chrysaora isosceles and Cyanea lamarckii in bell jars and published the results, observing their breeding and feeding habits. It was due to this pioneering work that the first identification of the various life cycle stages (medusa and hydra) belong to which species. Her laboratory was referred to as the department which her nephew, Peter Delap, described as an "heroic jumble of books, specimens, aquaria, with its pervasive low-tide smell."

Due to her contributions to marine biology she was offered a position in 1906 in the Plymouth Marine Biological Station, she declined due to her father's reaction, which reputedly was "No daughter of mine will leave home, except as a married woman." Delap's interest continued in many forms of flora and fauna, which included the identification of a True's beaked whale which washed up on the island. This was a whale species that was previously only known from an incomplete specimen from the United States.

== Later life and recognition ==
Delap had a sea anemone named in her honour, Edwardsia delapiae, which she first recorded in eelgrass on Valentia Island's shores. This anemone is found in shallow sea water and it is unknown outside Valentia Island. The naming had been suggested by Thomas Alan Stephenson in his book British sea anemones. Stephenson notes in his book that "Miss Delap's skill and persistence in collecting rare species are indefatigable."

In 1936 Delap was made an associate of the Linnean Society of London. She died in July 1953, having been predeceased by all of her siblings, and was buried alongside her sisters near Knightstown, County Kerry.

A plaque was erected to her in 1998 on Valentia Island by the Irish National Committee for Commemorative Plaques in Science and Technology. Maude was also the subject of an art work by Dorothy Cross, exploring her life and interaction with contemporary scientists and artists.

The poem 'Maude, Enthralled' from Doireann Ní Ghríofa's poetry collection To star the dark (2021) is dedicated Delap.

== Publications ==
- Browne, Edward Thomas and Delap, Maude Jane (1890) Notebooks, Drawings and Papers on Hydrozoa and Other Coelenterates from Valencia, Port Erin, Plymouth and Elsewhere
- Delap, Maude Jane (1899) Diary Recording Observations on Coelenterata and Other Marine Animals Around Valencia, Ireland
