= Thomas Alan Stephenson =

British zoologist (1898–1961)

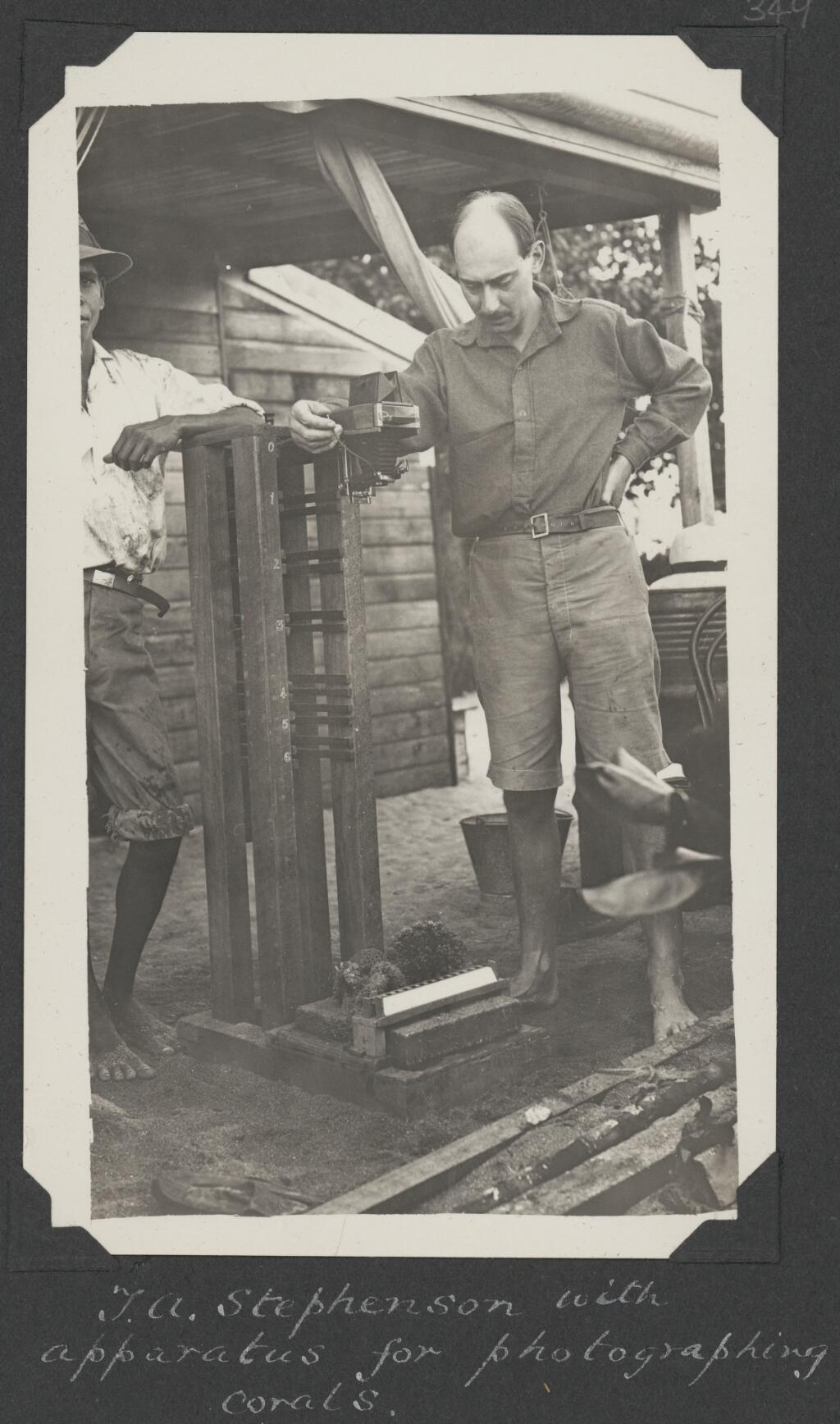
- Stephenson during the 1928 Great Barrier Reef expedition
- Born: Thomas Alan Stephenson; 19 January 1898; Burnham-on-Sea
- Died: 3 April 1961 (aged 63); London
- Education: Aberystwyth University
- Awards: Fellow of the Royal Society
- Scientific career
- Workplaces: Aberystwyth University
- Author abbrev. (botany): T.A.Stephenson
- Author abbrev. (zoology): T.A.Stephenson

Thomas Alan Stephenson FRS (19 January 1898 – 3 April 1961) was a British naturalist and marine biologist who specialised in sea anemones.

== Early life ==
Thomas Alan Stephenson, who went by his middle name, was born on 19 January 1898 in Burnham-on-Sea in Surrey, England. He was the eldest of three born to Thomas Stephenson, a Wesleyan minister and amateur botanist, and Margaret Stephenson (née Fletcher); a brother and sister would follow.

The first six years of Stephenson's life were spent in Richmond, Surrey, where his father was a tutor at Richmond Theological College; his mother's father was the college's governor. These years, according to his obituary, "were the pleasantest in Alan Stephenson’s childhood". As Stephenson later recalled, "[w]e lived in the Governor’s well appointed house, and had the run of the large College grounds and kitchen-garden, so that we were brought up in all the surroundings and circumstances usual to gentlefolk of good education in the Edwardian period. We were surrounded by flower-gardens, had Richmond Park and the Terrace Gardens and river close at hand (not to mention all the rather more remote attractions of the London area), and were provided with an adequate staff of well trained nurse maids, servants and gardeners."

In 1904, Stephenson's father left the college and assumed the traditional role of a Wesleyan minister: "circuits," typically three years each, spent in different locations. These circuits began at Clapham, and included stints at (amongst many other locations) Wrexham, Timperley, and Aberystwyth. The frequent moves were difficult for Stephenson, whose education was inevitably fragmented, and who found it impossible to establish childhood friendships.

== Education ==
Stephenson attended schools in both Clapham and Wrexham. Living in Wrexham introduced Stephenson to Harold Drinkwater, a physician and amateur botanist who was also a skilled painter. "Dr Drinkwater", Stephenson later wrote, "was a remarkable man. Gifted in drawing, he made no special use of his ability until about the age of 60, when an interest in botany led him to begin painting a long series of portraits of British plants. For this purpose he invented a method of his own. Maintaining that a portrait of a plant looked very unnatural against a white background, he taught himself to paint it on rather rough sage-green paper, using Chinese white in the undercoats as a foundation for the brilliant colours of the overpainting. In a few years he produced a remarkable series of paintings, many of which are now in the National Museum of Wales at Cardiff. I was fortunate enough to know him during his most productive period, and he was more than kind to me. He allowed me to paint flowers with him, so that I learnt all he could teach; he took me on his rounds with him; he and his wife made me permanently welcome at their house; and he procured anatomical material for me through which I made my first acquaintance with human anatomy. This friendship was maintained as long as he lived, after my family left Wrexham." After Wrexham, Stephenson boarded at Kingswood School in Bath. Living in a 50-person dormitory and with few places to sit besides the library and classrooms, Stephenson eschewed school games in favor of long walks in the country.

Stephenson's academic career was perhaps due only to the accident of his father's travels taking the family to Aberystwyth from 1914 to 1919. (Note: During this time, from 1915 to 1917, Stephenson or perhaps his father were members of the Moss Exchange Club.) Stephenson matriculated at University College, Aberystwyth in October 1915, although his studies were interrupted by illness: tubercular infections of abdominal and cervical glands which later involved the appendix, requiring an operation and time in a sanatorium. This meant an atypical college experience, involving both coursework and private instruction. Stephenson came under the particular wing of the zoologist and geographer H. J. Fleure, a "unique and remarkable man", in Stephenson's words, who "encouraged me unflaggingly from the start". Fleure nurtured Stephenson's already-developing interest in sea anemones, and saw him appointed as student-demonstrator in 1916. Fleur also facilitated access for Stephenson to the sea anemones collected during the 1910–1913 Terra Nova Expedition to Antarctica, and directed Stephenson's study of them. This resulted in the first of several articles on the subject, published when Stephenson was 20. In 1920 and with Fleure's backing, Stephenson was permitted to obtain a Master of Science on the strength of his publications.

From 1920 to 1922 or 1923, Stephenson undertook research work at Aberystwyth, backed by a grant from the Department of Scientific and Industrial Research. Stephenson also began collaborating with his father on a series of papers on orchids. The two coauthored more than 20 papers and notes between 1920 and 1926. Much of this work focused on the genera Epipactis and Dactylorhiza. (Note: Now recognized as a distinct genus, Dactylorhiza was then classified under the genus Orchis.) "Perhaps their most important single contribution", according to V. S. Summerhayes, the botanist in charge of the orchid herbarium at Royal Botanical Gardens, Kew, "was their recognition and definition of Orchis purpurella"—now Dactylorhiza purpurella—"which is now known as a widely spread member of the British flora". Another contribution was to recognize the distinction between the variants Epipactis dunensis (now recognized as a species) and Epipactis phyllanthes var. vectensis. In 1923 and again with Fleure's backing, Stephenson obtained a Doctor of Science in the same way he obtained his Masters; the publications submitted in support of his degree included those on both sea anemones and orchids.

== Career ==
In 1922, Stephenson was appointed lecturer in zoology at University College, London. His work on orchids and sea anemones continued, and in 1928, he published the first of two volumes of The British Sea Anemones. Work on the second volume would be delayed, however, for that same year, Stephenson joined the 1928 Great Barrier Reef expedition at the invitation of Maurice Yonge, the expedition's leader. Stephenson was "an obvious choice", Yonge later wrote, given "his intimate acquaintance with the group of animals most closely allied to the madreporarian corals and his intense interest in marine biology".

Stephenson held a number of academic posts in Britain, and at the University of Cape Town, South Africa. His final position was that of Professor and Head of the Department of Zoology at the University College of Wales, Aberystwyth.

The National Marine Biological Library at the Marine Biological Association in Plymouth hold some of his personal and scientific records, including paintings, negatives and notebooks on South Africa.

== Personal life ==
Stephenson married Anne Wood in 1922. She was the younger of twin sisters born to Joseph Dore Wood, the secretary for the Barry Graving Dock and Engineering Company, which built the south Wales docks, and Anna Eliza Wood. The Stephensons had no children. Stephenson died on 3 April 1961, aged 63, in a London hospital.

== Publications ==
=== Books ===
- Stephenson, Thomas Alan (1928). The British Sea Anemones, Volume I. Ray Society Publications. Vol. 113. London: Ray Society. OCLC 931327099.

- Stephenson, Thomas Alan (1935). The British Sea Anemones, Volume II. Ray Society Publications. Vol. 121. London: Ray Society. OCLC 931327099.

- Stephenson, Thomas Alan (1944). Seashore Life and Pattern. London: The King Penguin Books. OCLC 1199112.
- Stephenson, Thomas Alan. Experiments in design. Unpublished typescript. OCLC 1008128841.

- Bound copy held by the National Art Library, along with photographs intended as plates.

- Stephenson, Thomas Alan. A scientist looks at modern art. Unpublished typescript. OCLC 1008433864.

- Bound copy (in two volumes) held by the National Art Library, along with photographs intended as plates.
- Quoted in a lecture by Alister Hardy: Hardy, Alister (1966). "The Numinous, the Love of Nature and the Inspiration of Art". The Divine Flame: An Essay Towards a Natural History of Religion. London: Collins. pp. 107–132.; republished as Hardy, Alister (1978). "The Numinous, the Love of Nature and the Inspiration of Art". The Divine Flame: An Essay Towards a Natural History of Religion (2nd ed.). Oxford: Manchester College. pp. 107–132. ISBN 0-906165-03-2.; published online as "Lecture V: The Numinous, The Love of Nature and the Inspiration of Art". The Gifford Lectures. 24 September 2018. Archived from the original on 27 January 2023.

=== Chapters ===
- Stephenson, Thomas Alan (1953). "The World Between Tidemarks". In Marshall, Sheina Macalister & Orr, Andrew Picken (eds.). Essays in Marine Biology. Edinburgh: Oliver and Boyd. pp. 73–100. OCLC 1498862.

=== Articles ===
- Stephenson, Thomas & Stephenson, Thomas Alan (January 1918). "A New Form of Helleborine Viridiflora". Journal of Botany, British and Foreign. LVI (661). London: Taylor and Francis: 1–4.
- Stephenson, Thomas Alan (27 April 1918). "Coelenterata, Part I: Actiniaria". British Antarctic ("Terra Nova") Expedition, 1910: Natural History Report. V (1). London: Trustees of the British Museum: 1–68.
- Stephenson, Thomas Alan (November 1918). "On Certain Actiniaria Collected off Ireland by the Irish Fisheries Department, during the Years 1899–1913". Proceedings of the Royal Irish Academy. XXXIV (B7). Royal Irish Academy: 106–168. JSTOR 20490280.
- Stephenson, Thomas Alan (1920). "The Genus Corallimorphus". Proceedings of the Royal Irish Academy. XXXV (B9). Royal Irish Academy: 178–186. JSTOR 20517059.
- Stephenson, Thomas Alan (July 1920). "On the Classification of Actiniaria. Part I.—Forms with Acontia and Forms with a Mesoglœal Sphincter". Quarterly Journal of Microscopical Science. New Series. 64 (256): 425–572. doi:10.1242/jcs.s2-64.256.425.
- Stephenson, Thomas & Stephenson, Thomas Alan (July 1920). "A New Marsh Orchis". Journal of Botany, British and Foreign. LVIII (691). London: Taylor and Francis: 164–170.
- Stephenson, Thomas & Stephenson, Thomas Alan (September 1920). "The Genus Epipactis in Britain". Journal of Botany, British and Foreign. LVIII (693). London: Taylor and Francis: 209–213.
- Stephenson, Thomas & Stephenson, Thomas Alan (October 1920). "The British Marsh Orchids in relation to Mendelian Principles". Journal of Botany, British and Foreign. LVIII (694). London: Taylor and Francis: 243–247.
- Stephenson, Thomas & Stephenson, Thomas Alan (November 1920). "The British Palmate Orchids". Journal of Botany, British and Foreign. LVIII (695). London: Taylor and Francis: 257–262.
- Stephenson, Thomas & Stephenson, Thomas Alan (January 1921). "Orchis latifolia in Britain". Journal of Botany, British and Foreign. LIX (697). London: Taylor and Francis: 1–7.
- Stephenson, Thomas & Stephenson, Thomas Alan (February 1921). "Epipactis latifolia in Britain". Journal of Botany, British and Foreign. LIX (698). London: Taylor and Francis: 33–39.
- Stephenson, Thomas & Stephenson, Thomas Alan (May 1921). "The forms of Orchis maculata". Journal of Botany, British and Foreign. LIX (701). London: Taylor and Francis: 121–128.
- Stephenson, Thomas Alan (November 1921). "On the Classification of Actiniaria. Part II.—Consideration of the whole group and its relationships, with special reference to forms not treated in Part I". Quarterly Journal of Microscopical Science. New Series. 65 (260). London: Oxford University Press: 493–576. doi:10.1242/jcs.s2-65.260.493.
- Stephenson, Thomas & Stephenson, Thomas Alan (November 1921). "Natural Hybrid Orchids from Arran". The Orchid Review. XXIX (341). Richmond, Surrey: Orchid Review, Ltd.: 131–133.
- Stephenson, Thomas & Stephenson, Thomas Alan (December 1921). "Orchis purpurella". The Orchid Review. XXIX (342). Richmond, Surrey: Orchid Review, Ltd.: 163–165.
- Stephenson, Thomas & Stephenson, Thomas Alan (February 1922). "Hybrids of Orchis purpurella". Journal of Botany, British and Foreign. LX (710). London: Taylor and Francis: 33–35.
- Stephenson, Thomas & Stephenson, Thomas Alan (April 1922). "Hybrids of Gymnadenia conopsea and Cœloglossum viride". The Orchid Review. XXX (346). Richmond, Surrey: Orchid Review, Ltd.: 101–103.
- Stephenson, Thomas Alan (June 1922). "On the Classification of Actiniaria. Part III.—Definitions connected with the forms dealt with in Part II". Quarterly Journal of Microscopical Science. New Series. 66 (262). London: J. & A. Churchill: 247–319. doi:10.1242/jcs.s2-66.262.247.
- Stephenson, Thomas Alan (October 1922). "The Genus Ilyanthus, Forbes". Journal of the Marine Biological Association of the United Kingdom. New Series. XII (4). Plymouth: Marine Biological Association of the United Kingdom: 819–828. doi:10.1017/S0025315400009826. S2CID 84822647.
- Stephenson, Thomas & Stephenson, Thomas Alan (March 1923). "Orchis prætermissa Druce". Journal of Botany, British and Foreign. LXI (723). London: Taylor and Francis: 65–68.
- Stephenson, Thomas & Stephenson, Thomas Alan (November 1923). "The British Forms of Orchis incarnata". Journal of Botany, British and Foreign. LXI (731). London: Taylor and Francis: 273–278.
- Godfery, Masters John; Stephenson, Thomas & Stephenson, Thomas Alan (June 1924). "The British Dactylorchids" (PDF). Journal of Botany, British and Foreign. LXII (738). London: Taylor and Francis: 175–178.
- Stephenson, Thomas Alan (November 1924). "Notes on Haliotis tuberculata: I" (PDF). Journal of the Marine Biological Association of the United Kingdom. New Series. XIII (2). Plymouth: Marine Biological Association of the United Kingdom: 480–495. doi:10.1017/S0025315400007621. S2CID 83956416.
- Stephenson, Thomas Alan (April 1925). "On Sea Anemones". Discovery: A Monthly Popular Journal of Knowledge. VI (64): 119–122. ISSN 0366-9238.
- Stephenson, Thomas & Stephenson, Thomas Alan (April 1925). "Some French Marsh Orchids". Journal of Botany, British and Foreign. LXIII (748). London: Taylor and Francis: 93–97.
- Stephenson, Thomas Alan (October 1925). "On a New British Sea Anemone". Journal of the Marine Biological Association of the United Kingdom. New Series. XIII (4). Plymouth: Marine Biological Association of the United Kingdom: 880–890. doi:10.1017/S0025315400009310. S2CID 86403474.
- Carlgren, Oskar & Stephenson, Thomas Alan (February 1928). "The British Edwardsidae" (PDF). Journal of the Marine Biological Association of the United Kingdom. New Series. XV (1). Plymouth: Marine Biological Association of the United Kingdom: 1–31. doi:10.1017/S002531540005551X. S2CID 73565978. Archived (PDF) from the original on 6 July 2022.
- Stephenson, Thomas Alan (1929). "A Contribution to Actinian Morphology: the Genera Phellia and Sagartia". Transactions of the Royal Society of Edinburgh. LVI (1): 121–139. doi:10.1017/S0080456800027757. S2CID 87336377.
- Carlgren, Oskar; Stephenson, Thomas Alan (April 1929). "Actiniaria" (PDF). Australasian Antarctic Expedition 1911–14: Scientific Reports. Series C. IX (2). Sydney: Alfred James Kent: 1–34.
- Stephenson, Thomas Alan (May 1929). "On Methods of Reproduction as Specific Characters" (PDF). Journal of the Marine Biological Association of the United Kingdom. New Series. XVI (1). Plymouth: Marine Biological Association of the United Kingdom: 131–172. doi:10.1017/S0025315400029751. S2CID 55913431.
- Stephenson, Thomas Alan (May 1929). "On the Nematocysts of Sea Anemones" (PDF). Journal of the Marine Biological Association of the United Kingdom. New Series. XVI (1). Plymouth: Marine Biological Association of the United Kingdom: 173–200. doi:10.1017/S0025315400029763. S2CID 59424046.
- Stephenson, Thomas Alan (March 1930). "How Animals Breed in the Sea". Discovery: A Monthly Popular Journal of Knowledge. XI (123): 94–97. ISSN 0366-9238. OCLC 1566764.
- Stephenson, Thomas Alan; Stephenson, Anne; Tandy, Geoffrey & Spender, Michael (25 July 1931). "The Structure and Ecology of Low Isles and Other Reefs". Great Barrier Reef Expedition, 1928–29: Scientific Reports. III (2). London: Trustees of the British Museum: 17–112.
- Stephenson, Thomas Alan (15 August 1931). "Development and the Formation of Colonies in Pocillopora and Porites—Part I". Great Barrier Reef Expedition, 1928–29: Scientific Reports. III (3). London: Trustees of the British Museum: 113–134.
- Stephenson, Thomas Alan & Stephenson, Anne (25 February 1933). "Growth and Asexual Reproduction in Corals". Great Barrier Reef Expedition, 1928–29: Scientific Reports. III (7). London: Trustees of the British Museum: 167–217.
- Marshall, Sheina M. & Stephenson, Thomas Alan (25 March 1933). "The Breeding of Reef Animals: Part I, the Corals". Great Barrier Reef Expedition, 1928–29: Scientific Reports. III (8). London: Trustees of the British Museum: 219–245.

- see also Stephenson, Anne (24 March 1934). "The Breeding of Reef Animals: Part II, Invertebrates Other Than Corals". Great Barrier Reef Expedition, 1928–29: Scientific Reports. III (9). London: Trustees of the British Museum: 247–272.

- Stephenson, Thomas Alan; Zoond, Alexander & Eyre, Joyce (April 1934). "The Liberation and Utilisation of Oxygen by the Population of Rock-Pools". The Journal of Experimental Biology. XI (2). London: Cambridge University Press: 162–172. doi:10.1242/jeb.11.2.162.
- Stephenson, Thomas Alan (27 March 1936). "The marine ecology of the South African coasts, with special reference to the habits of limpets". Proceedings of the Linnean Society of London. 148 (2). London: Linnean Society of London: 74–79. doi:10.1111/j.1095-8312.1936.tb00094.x.
- Manton, Sidnie Milana & Stephenson, Thomas Alan (27 July 1936). "Ecological Surveys of Coral Reefs". Great Barrier Reef Expedition, 1928–29: Scientific Reports. III (10). London: Trustees of the British Museum: 273–312.
- Stephenson, Thomas Alan; Stephenson, Anne & Du Toit, Cornelius Albertus (1937). "The South African Intertidal Zone and its Relation to Ocean Currents, I: A Temperate Indian Ocean Shore". Transactions of the Royal Society of South Africa. XXIV (4). Royal Society of South Africa: 341–382. doi:10.1080/00359193709518928.
- Stephenson, Thomas Alan; Stephenson, Anne & Bright, Katherine Marjorie Frances (December 1938). "The South African Intertidal Zone and its Relation to Ocean Currents, IV: The Port Elizabeth District". Annals of the Natal Museum. IX (1). Adlard & Son, Ltd.: 1–20.
- Eyre, Joyce & Stephenson, Thomas Alan (December 1938). "The South African Intertidal Zone and its Relation to Ocean Currents, V: A Sub-tropical Indian Ocean Shore". Annals of the Natal Museum. IX (1). Adlard & Son, Ltd.: 21–46.
- Bokenham, Naomi A. H. & Stephenson, Thomas Alan (December 1938). "The Colonization of Denuded Rock Surfaces in the Intertidal Region of the Cape Peninsula". Annals of the Natal Museum. IX (1). Adlard & Son, Ltd.: 47–81.
- Bokenham, Naomi A. H.; Neugebauer, F. L. M. & Stephenson, Thomas Alan (December 1938). "The Vertical Distribution of certain Intertidal Marine Gastropods in False Bay, with Notes on the Development of Two of Them". Annals of the Natal Museum. IX (1). Adlard & Son, Ltd.: 113–137.
- Stephenson, Thomas Alan (January 1939). "The constitution of the intertidal fauna and flora of South Africa.–Part I". Journal of the Linnean Society of London, Zoology. XL (273). London: Linnean Society of London: 487–586. doi:10.1111/j.1096-3642.1939.tb01691.x.
- Stephenson, Thomas Alan; Stephenson, Anne & Day, John H. (12 July 1940). "The South African Intertidal Zone and its Relation to Ocean Currents, VIII: Lamberts Bay and the West Coast". Annals of the Natal Museum. IX (3). Adlard & Son, Ltd.: 345–380.
- Tomlin, John Read le Brockton & Stephenson, Thomas Alan (23 January 1942). "South African Patellidae". Proceedings of the Malacological Society of London. 25 (1). London: Malacological Society of London: 4–9. doi:10.1093/oxfordjournals.mollus.a064424.
- Stephenson, Thomas Alan (June 1943). "A Symposium on Intertidal Zonation of Animals and Plants: (1) The Causes of the Vertical and Horizontal Distribution of Organisms Between Tidemarks in South Africa". Proceedings of the Linnean Society of London. 154 (3). London: Linnean Society of London: 219–232. doi:10.1111/j.1095-8312.1943.tb00322.x.
- Stephenson, Thomas Alan (December 1944). "The Constitution of the Intertidal Fauna and Flora of South Africa: Part II". Annals of the Natal Museum. X (3). Adlard & Son, Ltd.: 261–356.
- Stephenson, Thomas Alan (July 1946). "Coral reefs". Endeavour. V (19). London: Imperial Chemical Industries Limited: 96–106. OCLC 1567873.
- Stephenson, Thomas Alan (October 1947). "The colours of marine animals". Endeavour. VI (24). London: Imperial Chemical Industries Limited: 152–159. OCLC 1567873.
- Stephenson, Thomas Alan (March 1948). "The Constitution of the Intertidal Fauna and Flora of South Africa: Part III". Annals of the Natal Museum. XI (2). Adlard & Son, Ltd.: 207–324.
- Stephenson, Thomas Alan & Stephenson, Anne (December 1949). "The Universal Features of Zonation Between Tide-Marks on Rocky Coasts". The Journal of Ecology. 37 (2). London: Cambridge University Press: 289–305. doi:10.2307/2256610. JSTOR 2256610.
- Stephenson, Thomas Alan; Stephenson, Anne (January 1950). "Life between tidemarks in North America". Endeavour. IX (33). London: Imperial Chemical Industries Limited: 11–17. OCLC 1567873.
- Stephenson, Thomas Alan & Stephenson, Anne (November 1950). "Life Between Tide-Marks in North America, I: The Florida Keys". The Journal of Ecology. 38 (2). London: Cambridge University Press: 354–402. doi:10.2307/2256451. JSTOR 2256451.
- Stephenson, Thomas Alan & Stephenson, Anne (February 1952). "Life Between Tide-Marks in North America, II: Northern Florida and the Carolinas". The Journal of Ecology. 40 (1). London: Cambridge University Press: 1–49. doi:10.2307/2258019. JSTOR 2258019.
- Stephenson, Thomas Alan & Stephenson, Anne (January 1954). "Life Between Tide-Marks in North America, IIIA: Nova Scotia and Prince Edward Island: Description of the Region". The Journal of Ecology. 42 (1). London: Cambridge University Press: 14–45. doi:10.2307/2256977. JSTOR 2256977.
- Stephenson, Thomas Alan & Stephenson, Anne (January 1954). "Life Between Tide-Marks in North America, IIIB: Nova Scotia and Prince Edward Island: The Geographical Features of the Region". The Journal of Ecology. 42 (1). London: Cambridge University Press: 46–70. doi:10.2307/2256978. JSTOR 2256978.
- Stephenson, Thomas Alan; Stephenson, Anne (April 1954). "The Bermuda Islands". Endeavour. XIII (50). London: Imperial Chemical Industries Limited: 72–80. OCLC 1567873.
- Stephenson, Thomas Alan & Stephenson, Anne (January 1955). "The mode of Occurrence of the Universal Intertidal Zones in Great Britain, II: A Further Comment on the Results". The Journal of Ecology. 43 (1). London: Cambridge University Press: 286–290. doi:10.2307/2257135. JSTOR 2257135.
- Stephenson, Thomas Alan (12 July 1960). "The southern cold temperate coasts, with special reference to South Africa". Proceedings of the Royal Society of London. Series B. Biological Sciences. 152 (949). London: The Royal Society of London: 635–638. Bibcode:1960RSPSB.152..635S. doi:10.1098/rspb.1960.0072. JSTOR 75295. S2CID 128480353.
- Stephenson, Thomas Alan & Stephenson, Anne (February 1961). "Life Between Tide-Marks in North America, IVA: Vancouver Island, I". The Journal of Ecology. 49 (1). Oxford: Blackwell Scientific Publications: 1–29. doi:10.2307/2257420. JSTOR 2257420.
- Stephenson, Thomas Alan & Stephenson, Anne (June 1961). "Life Between Tide-Marks in North America, IVB: Vancouver Island, II". The Journal of Ecology. 49 (2). Oxford: Blackwell Scientific Publications: 227–243. doi:10.2307/2257258. JSTOR 2257258.

=== Other ===
- Stephenson, Thomas & Stephenson, Thomas Alan (July 1921). "Epipactis viridiflora". Journal of Botany, British and Foreign. LIX (703). London: Taylor and Francis: 205.
- Stephenson, Thomas & Stephenson, Thomas Alan (August 1921). "Orchis prætermissa Druce and O. purpurella Stephenson". Journal of Botany, British and Foreign. LIX (704). London: Taylor and Francis: 234.
- Stephenson, Thomas & Stephenson, Thomas Alan (September 1921). "Epipactis". The Botanical Society and Exchange Club of the British Isles: Report for 1920. VI (I). Abroath: T. Buncle & Co.: 44–46.
- Stephenson, Thomas & Stephenson, Thomas Alan (September 1922). "Epipactis Viridiflora Reichb". The Botanical Society and Exchange Club of the British Isles: Report for 1921. VI (III). Abroath: T. Buncle & Co.: 308–309.
- Stephenson, Thomas & Stephenson, Thomas Alan (September 1922). "O. Purpurella". The Botanical Society and Exchange Club of the British Isles: Report for 1921. VI (III). Abroath: T. Buncle & Co.: 311–314.
- Stephenson, Thomas & Stephenson, Thomas Alan (November 1922). "Orchis elodes Grisebach". Journal of Botany, British and Foreign. LX (719). London: Taylor and Francis: 337.
- Stephenson, Thomas & Stephenson, Thomas Alan (February 1926). "Abnormal Form of Anacamptis pyramidalis". The Orchid Review. XXXIV (392). Richmond, Surrey: Orchid Review, Ltd.: 51.
- Stephenson, Thomas Alan (March 1941). A Summary Account of the Ecological Survey of the South African Coast Carried Out From the University of Cape Town During the Years 1931–40 (Report). Privately printed. OCLC 15432101.

== Bibliography ==
- "Archives Collection: Personal and Scientific Papers - Description". National Marine Biological Library. Marine Biological Association of the United Kingdom. Archived from the original on 26 January 2017.
- Brokenshire, F.A. (October 1949). "The Rev. Thomas Stephenson, B.A., D.D. (1855–1948)". Watsonia. I (III). Botanical Society of the British Isles: 187–189.
- Brown, Alexander Claude (2003). "Centennial history of the Zoology Department, University of Cape Town, 1903–2003: A personal memoir". Transactions of the Royal Society of South Africa. 58 (1). Royal Society of South Africa: 11–34. doi:10.1080/00359190309519932. ISSN 0035-919X. S2CID 82286351.
- Embleton, Ellen (3 May 2022). "Partners in paint". Royal Society Blog. The Royal Society. Archived from the original on 26 November 2022.
- H., E. G. (6 April 1961). "Prof. T. A. Stephenson". Obituary. The Times. No. 55, 048. London. p. 17. Archived from the original on 26 November 2022.
- Hutchings, Pat; Brown, Barbara E.; Byrne, Maria; Hamylton, Sarah & Spencer, Tom (21 September 2022). "The remarkable contributions of ten outstanding women to Australian coral reef science". Historical Records of Australian Science. 34. CSIRO Publishing: A–Q. doi:10.1071/HR22009. S2CID 252452474. Archived from the original on 26 November 2022.
- Moore, Keith (19 December 2013). "Fairytale of Aberystwyth". Royal Society Blog. The Royal Society. Archived from the original on 26 November 2022.
- Pantin, Carl Frederick Abel (September 1963). "Obituaries: Thomas Alan Stephenson". Proceedings of the Linnean Society of London. 174 (2). London: Linnean Society of London: 153–155. doi:10.1111/j.1095-8312.1963.tb00917.x.
- R., E. H. (8 April 1961). "Prof. T. A. Stephenson". Obituary. The Times. No. 55, 050. London. p. 12. Archived from the original on 26 November 2022.
- Russell, Frederick Stratten (13 May 1961). "Prof. Thomas Alan Stephenson, F.R.S." Nature. 190 (4776). Nature Publishing Group: 586. Bibcode:1961Natur.190..586R. doi:10.1038/190586a0.
- Spencer, Tom; Brown, Barbara E.; Hamylton, Sarah M. & McLean, Roger F. (2001). "'A Close and Friendly Alliance': Biology, Geology and the Great Barrier Reef Expedition of 1928–1929". In Hawkins, Stephen; Lemasson, Anaëlle J.; Allcock, Anne Louise; Bates, Amanda E.; Byrne, Maria; Evans, Ally J.; Firth, Louise B.; Marzinelli, Ezequiel M.; Russell, Bayden D.; Smith, I. Philip; Swearer, Stephen E. & Todd, Peter A. (eds.). Oceanography and Marine Biology: An Annual Review. Vol. 59. Boca Raton, Florida: CRC Press. pp. 89–138. doi:10.1201/9781003138846-2. ISBN 978-0-367-68522-5. ISSN 0078-3218.
- "Stephenson; Thomas Alan". The Royal Society. Archived from the original on 19 May 2022.
- "Thomas Alan Stephenson (1898-1961)". Natural History Museum, London. Archived from the original on 14 June 2012.
- Williams, Raymond Barry & Moore, Peter Geoffrey (October 2011). "An annotated catalogue of the marine biological paintings of Thomas Alan Stephenson (1898–1961)". Archives of Natural History. 38 (2). Edinburgh University Press: 242–266. doi:10.3366/anh.2011.0032.
- Williams, Raymond Barry (April 2012). "An annotated catalogue of the marine biological paintings of Thomas Alan Stephenson – additional notes". Archives of Natural History. 39 (1). Edinburgh University Press: 169–171. doi:10.3366/anh.2012.0072.
- Williams, Raymond Barry (April 2014). "An annotated catalogue of the marine biological paintings of Thomas Alan Stephenson – a fourth missing painting found". Archives of Natural History. 41 (1). Edinburgh University Press: 167–168. doi:10.3366/anh.2014.0222.
- Williams, Raymond Barry (October 2014). "An annotated catalogue of the botanical paintings of Thomas Alan Stephenson FLS (1898–1961)" (PDF). The Linnean. 30 (2). Linnean Society of London: 37–46. Archived (PDF) from the original on 26 November 2022.
- Yonge, Charles Maurice (November 1962). "Thomas Alan Stephenson: 1898–1961". Biographical Memoirs of Fellows of the Royal Society. 8. The Royal Society: 137–148. doi:10.1098/rsbm.1962.0010.
