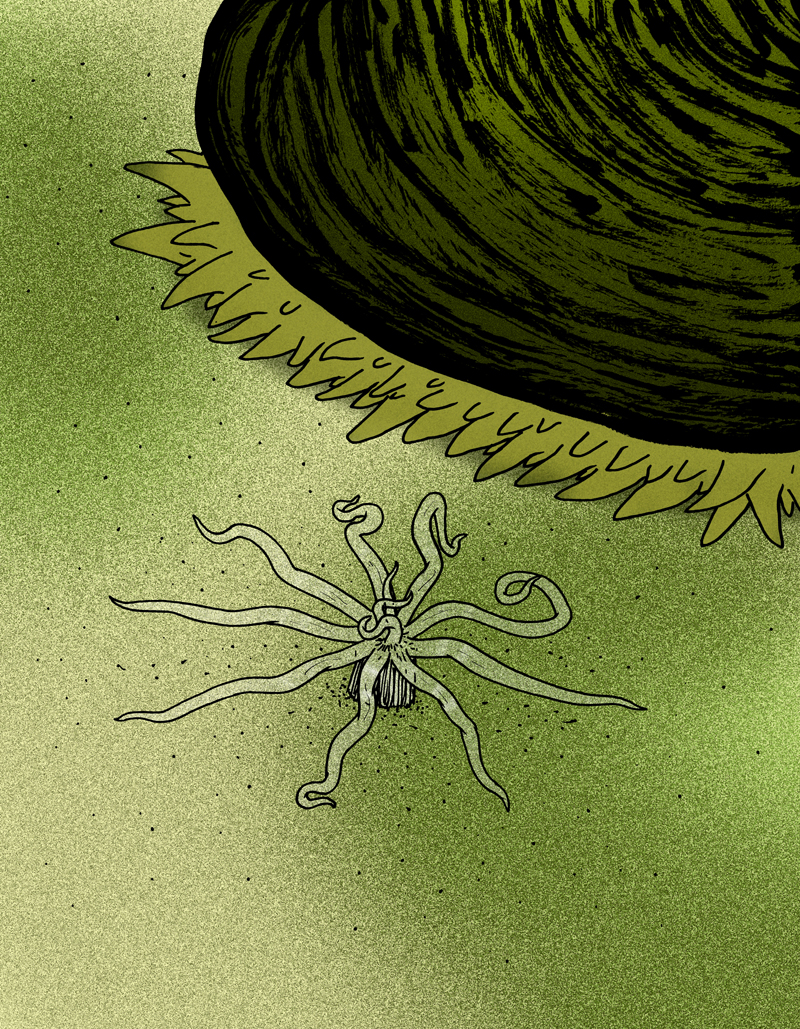
- Artist's image of the anemone

Conservation status
- Critically endangered, possibly extinct (IUCN 3.1)

Scientific classification
- Kingdom: Animalia
- Phylum: Cnidaria
- Subphylum: Anthozoa
- Class: Hexacorallia
- Order: Actiniaria
- Family: Edwardsiidae
- Genus: Edwardsia
- Species: E. ivelli

Binomial name
- Edwardsia ivelli Manuel, 1975

= Ivell's sea anemone =

Species of sea anemone

Ivell's sea anemone (Edwardsia ivelli) is a possibly extinct species of sea anemone in the family Edwardsiidae. It is endemic to a single location, Widewater Lagoon in West Sussex, England, where it was first discovered by Richard Ivell but has not been recorded since 1983.

== Taxonomy ==
Ivell's sea anemone was first formally described in 1975 by the marine biologist Richard L. Manuel from specimens collected at Widewater Lagoon by Professor Richard Ivell in 1973. Manuel recognised that these specimens were of a species in the genus Edwardsia but they did not belong to any species described from the United Kingdom, so he described the new species and named it in honour of Ivell. The genus Edwardsia was proposed in 1842 by Jean Louis Armand de Quatrefages de Bréau and is classified in the family Edwardsiidae, in the superfamily Edwardsioidea in the suborder Anenthemonae in the order Actiniaria, the sea anemones.

== Description ==
Ivell's sea anemone is a tiny, worm-like anemone up to 20 mm (0.79 in) long and 1.5 mm (0.059 in) diameter; the column is similar to other Edwardsia spp. There are twelve transparent tentacles, arranged in two cycles, nine tentacles in the outer cycle and three in the inner cycle. In life the tentacles of the outer cycle are held flat on the substrate, the three of the inner cycle more or less vertical, often curled over the mouth. Each tentacle has a few transverse bars of pale cream occasionally forming complete rings.

== Habitat and distribution ==
Ivell's sea anemone lives in long burrows in very soft mud in a saline lagoons and associated creeks.

It is endemic to England known from only one site, Widewater Lagoon in West Sussex, the type locality. Searches in recent years have failed to find any specimens and the species is considered extinct by some conservationists It was last recorded in 1983.
