= Edwardsiella =

Edwardsiella may refer to:

- Edwardsiella (bacterium), a genus of bacteria
- Edwardsiella (cnidarian), a genus of sea anemones
