= Nematosome =

Bodies found within starlet sea anemones

Nematosomes are multicellular motile bodies found in the gastrovascular cavity of the model sea anemone Nematostella vectensis starlet sea anemone. First described by Stephenson in 1935, nematosomes are the defining apomorphy (synapomorphy) of the genus Nematostella but have received relatively little study. Nematosomes can be observed circulating through the body cavity and tentacle lumen of adult anemones, occasionally coming to rest on the gastrodermis. Nematosomes that are dislodged from rest return to circulation. The lifespan of a single nematosome has not been studied.

== Development ==
Nematosomes arise by budding from the cnidoglandular tract of the mesenteries in N. vectensis; thus, they are of ectodermal origin. Although material can be seen circulating in the gastrovascular cavity from the onset of body cavity development, true nematosomes do not appear until approximately the same time that the polyp reaches sexual maturity. Inspection of the jelly matrix surrounding a spawned egg mass will reveal abundant nematosomes; male anemones do not appear to release nematosomes during spawning. Once outside the body cavity, nematosomes can live from one to several days in dilute seawater, dependent upon the temperature at which they are housed.

== Cell Biology ==
Since the time of their description, nematosomes have been known to be populated by abundant cnidocytes (also known as nematocytes) and "flagellated cells". Two of the three types of cnidocytes found in N. vectensis are commonly found in nematosomes: basitrichous isorhizas and microbasic p-mastigophores. The flagellated cells are known only to have a long motile cilium. Although they arise from a portion of the mesenteries that also contains abundant gland cells, no gland cells have ever been found in nematosomes. A recent study found cells with the capacity to undergo phagocytosis in the nematosomes. These phagocytotic cells appear to be the same as the "flagellated cells" described previously.

== Putative Function ==
The abundance of cnidocytes in nematosomes led to the early hypothesis that this tissue plays a role in immobilization of prey. Although the veracity of this hypothesis was challenged, recent evidence has confirmed that cniodcytes in nematosomes are capable of firing and immobilizing juvenile brine shrimp. Because nematosomes are embedded in the spawned egg mass, it is likely they also play a role in deterring potential egg predators. This hypothesis has not been tested but anecdotal observations suggest killifish may indeed be deterred by the nematosomes surrounding eggs. The presence of phagocytes in this tissue suggests nematosomes may play a role in clearing the gastrovascular cavity of foreign material and/or pathogens. Explicit testing of this hypothesis is needed.
