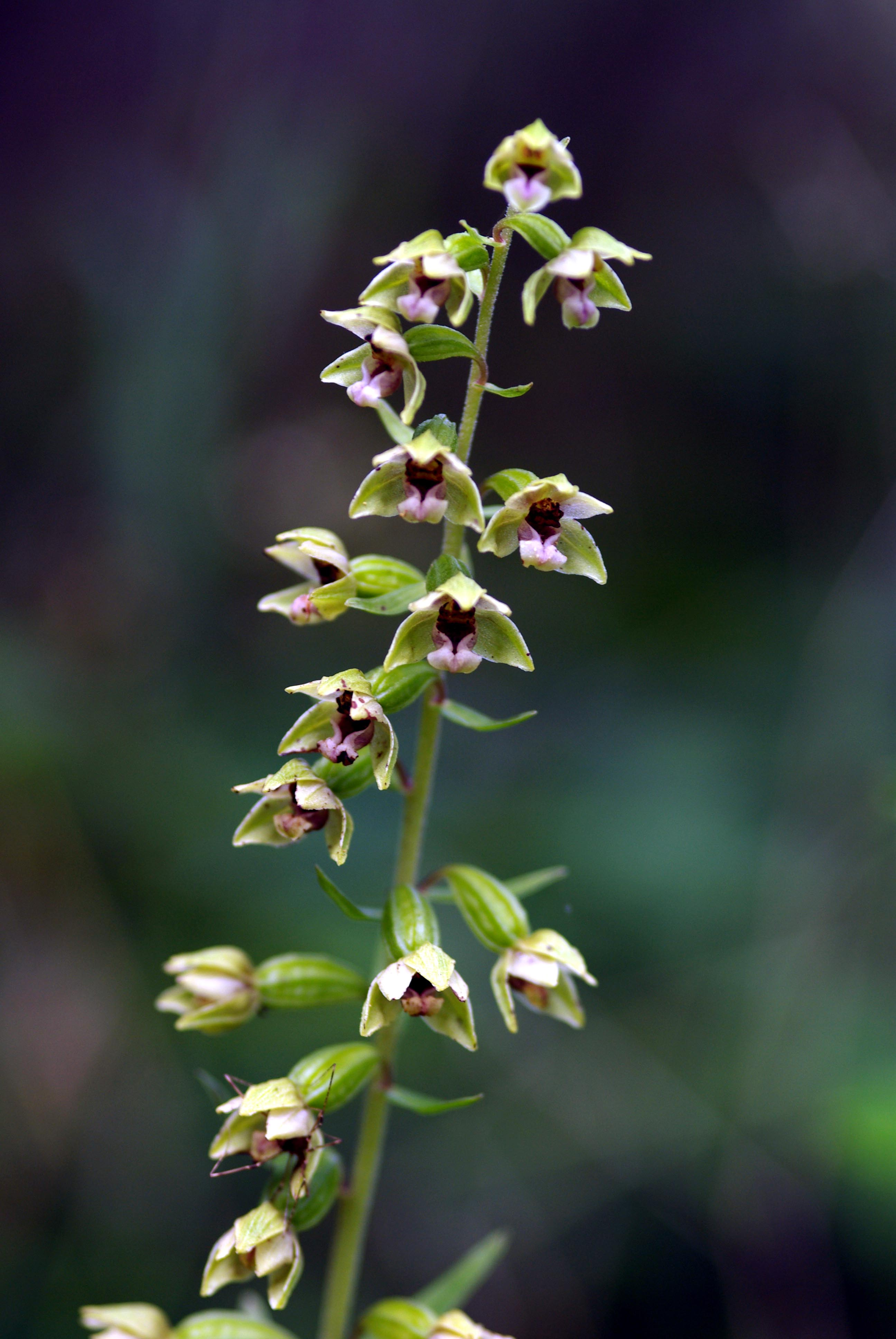
- On Anglesey sand-dunes

Scientific classification
- Kingdom: Plantae
- Clade: Tracheophytes
- Clade: Angiosperms
- Clade: Monocots
- Order: Asparagales
- Family: Orchidaceae
- Subfamily: Epidendroideae
- Genus: Epipactis
- Species: E. dunensis

Binomial name
- Epipactis dunensis (T.Stephenson & T.A.Stephenson) Godfery

Synonyms
- List: Epipactis dunensis subsp. sancta (P.Delforge) Kreutz; Epipactis dunensis var. tynensis (Kreutz) P.Delforge; Epipactis dunensis subsp. tynensis Kreutz; Epipactis leptochila subsp. sancta (P.Delforge) Kreutz; Epipactis muelleri var. dunensis (T.Stephenson & T.A.Stephenson) P.D.Sell; Epipactis peitzii var. sancta P.Delforge; Epipactis sancta (P.Delforge) P.Delforge

= Epipactis dunensis =

Species of orchid

Epipactis dunensis, commonly known as dune helleborine, is a species of plant in the orchid family Orchidaceae and is endemic to Great Britain and Ireland. It typically grows to a height of 20–50 cm (7.9–19.7 in) and the upper half of the flowering stalk is hairy. The plant has a long, fleshy rootstock and three to ten yellowish green, oval to lance-shaped leaves arranged in opposite rows along the flowering stem with up to 35 flowers. The three sepals are greenish, the two petals paler, the lower part of the labellum (the hypochile) is boat-shaped and dark, chocolate brown with a transparent, whitish rim and the epichile is heart-shaped with a pointed tip. Flowering occurs from late June to mid-August, the flowers are mainly self-pollinated, and the fruit is a capsule, from which light, microscopic seeds are spread by the wind.

The species was first formally described in 1918 by Thomas Stephenson and Thomas Alan Stephenson who gave it the name Helleborine viridiflora f. dunensis in the Journal of Botany, British and Foreign. In 1926, Masters John Godfery raised the form to species status as Epipactis dunensis.

Dune helleborine grows in willow scrub near the troughs of dunes in England, Scotland and on the east coast of the Irish Republic. Some authorities refer to the Tyne helleborine that grows in woodland in northern England and southern Scotland.
