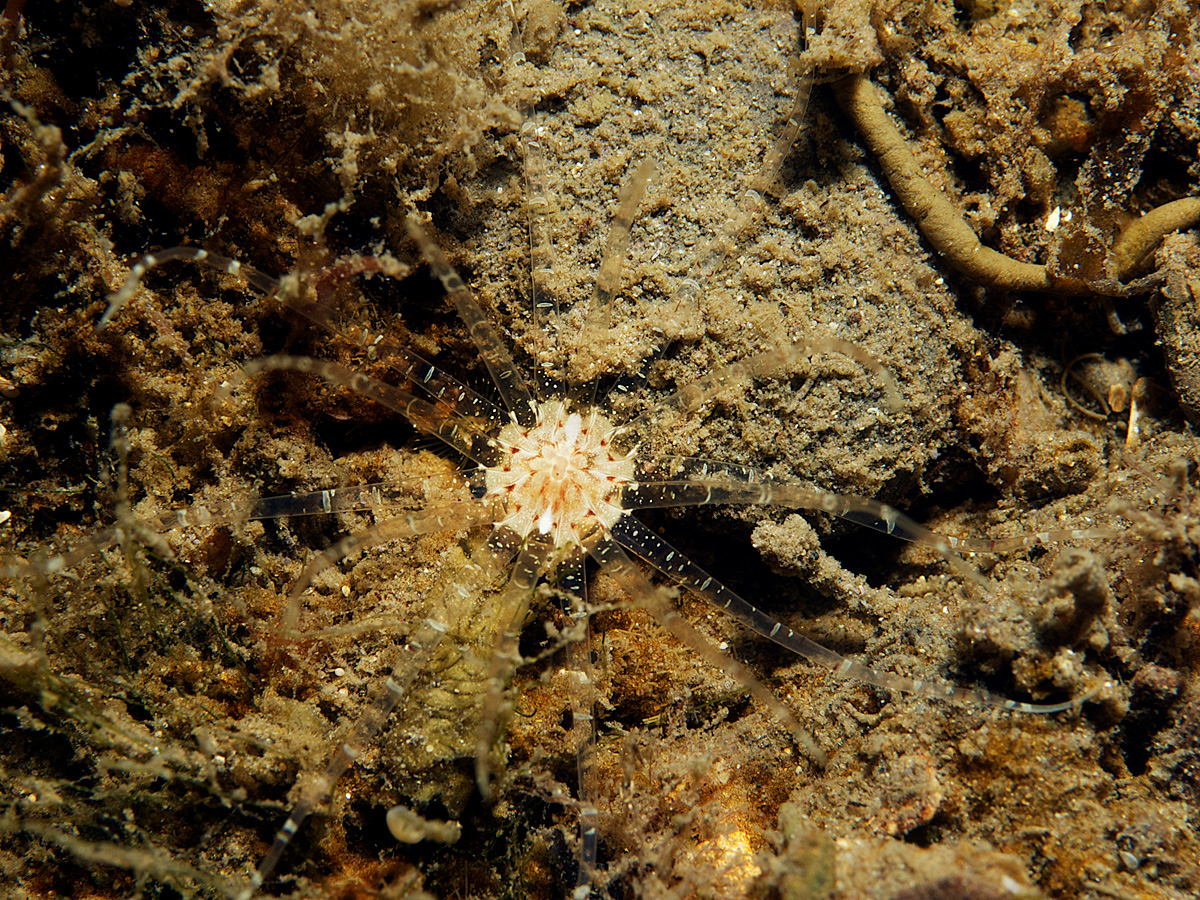
- Near Valentia Island, County Kerry, Ireland.

Scientific classification
- Kingdom: Animalia
- Phylum: Cnidaria
- Subphylum: Anthozoa
- Class: Hexacorallia
- Order: Actiniaria
- Family: Edwardsiidae
- Genus: Edwardsia
- Species: E. claparedii

Binomial name
- Edwardsia claparedii (Panceri, 1869)

Synonyms
- List: Edwardsia claparedeii; Edwardsia claparedi (Panceri, 1869); Edwardsia claparèdii; Edwardsia claperedii; Edwardsia grubii Andres, 1883; Halcampa claparedii Panceri, 1869; Urophysalus grubii Costa, 1869

= Edwardsia claparedii =

Species of sea anemone

Edwardsia claparedii is a species of sea anemone in the family Edwardsiidae.

== Distribution ==
Found frequently in depths of 5–30 m on all western coasts of British Isles and Atlantic coasts of southern Europe to the Mediterranean Sea.

== Habitat ==
Burrows in mud or muddy sand.
