= Widewater Lagoon =

Nature Reserve in UK

Coordinates: 50.824°N 0.299°W

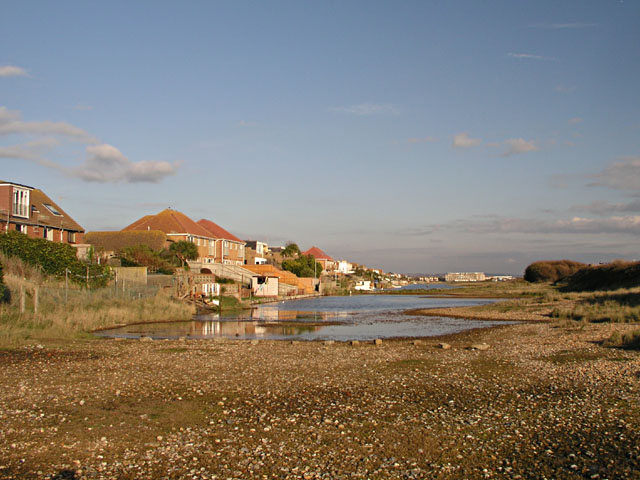
- Interactive map of Widewater Lagoon
- Type: Local Nature Reserve
- Location: Lancing, West Sussex
- OS grid: TQ 199 041
- Area: 8.8 hectares (22 acres)
- Manager: Lancing Parish Council

Widewater Lagoon is a 8.8-hectare (22-acre) Local Nature Reserve in Lancing in West Sussex. It is owned by West Sussex County Council and managed by Lancing Parish Council.

This coastal saline lagoon is separated from Lancing Beach by a man-made shingle bank. The water is brackish and there are wildfowl such as herons and swans. A survey of the lagoon in 2013 found a wide range of flora and fauna including the rare water beetle Enochrus bicolor.

There is access from Brighton Road, West Beach Road and via the footpath and cycle path running eastwards from Lancing beach green.

The Ivell's sea anemone is only known from this lagoon.
