= Constance Delap =

Irish marine biologist (1868–1935)

- Born: 29 November 1868; Templecrone Rectory, Dungloe, County Donegal, Ireland
- Died: 4 June 1935 (aged 66); Valentia Island, County Kerry, Ireland
- Relatives: Maude Delap
- Scientific career
- Fields: Marine biology

Constance "Connie" Delap (29 November 1868 – 4 June 1935) was a self-taught Irish marine biologist active on Valentia Island. In collaboration with her sister Maude, Delap was involved in the study of plankton from the coasts of Valentia Island.

== Biography ==
Delap was born on 29 November 1868 at Templecrone Rectory, Dungloe to The Rev Alexander Delap and Anna Jane Delap (née Goslett). One of 10 siblings, Delap was younger sister of the naturalist and marine biologist Maude Delap. Following her father's appointment as the rector of Valentia Island and Cahersiveen, the family moved in 1874 to Knightstown on Valentia Island . Delap's father was interested in natural history, and collected plants and animals from the Island shore with his daughters.

Between 1895 and 1896, a marine survey led by Edward T. Browne was undertaken in Valentia Island. Delap and Maude activity participated in the survey, and their contribution was acknowledged in the 1899 Proceedings of the Royal Irish Academy. The sisters continued the Valentia survey until 1898, sending their preserved specimens, drawings and notes to London. In 1905, the sisters published two papers about the plankton of Valentia Harbour for the periods of 1899 and 1901 and 1902 and 1905. Delap also collaborated with Maude on jellyfish research.

Following the death of her father in 1906, the Delap family moved to Reenellen House. On 4 June 1935, Delap died on Valentia Island aged 66.

== Publications ==
- Delap, M. J.; Delap, C. (1905). "Notes on the plankton of Valentia Harbour, 1899–1901". Report on the Sea and Inland Fisheries of Ireland for 1902-03. Part II - Scientific Investigations. II (I): 3–19.
- Delap, M. J.; Delap, C. (1905). "Notes on the plankton of Valentia Harbour, 1902-05". Report on the Sea and Inland Fisheries of Ireland for 1905. Part II - Scientific Investigations. III (VII (I)): 141–159.
