= Edith Philip Smith =

British botanist

Edith Philip Smith FLS DSc FRSE
- Born: 9 March 1897; Stirling, Scotland
- Died: 17 May 1976 (aged 79)
- Education: Somerville College, Oxford; University of Edinburgh
- Known for: botanist, academic, teacher

Edith Philip Smith FLS FRSE (9 March 1897 – 17 May 1976) was a botanist and teacher who became a fellow of the Royal Society of Edinburgh and Head of the Botany Department at Queen's College, Dundee (now the University of Dundee).

== Career ==
She was one of the first female graduates to receive a degree at the University of Oxford when the first women's graduation ceremony was held there in 1920. She studied at Somerville College, and in June 1920 passed exams in the School of Natural Science with first-class honours, leading to a BA. She then spent a year at Radcliffe College, Massachusetts, and undertook research in the plant physiology laboratory at Harvard. Next came a period in the Department of Botany at King's College London. In 1925 she was awarded a PhD from the University of Edinburgh. The following year, 1926, she was appointed as a lecturer in botany at University College, Dundee, which at that time was part of the University of St Andrews.

Over the next decade Smith published various botanical papers, a textbook and an ecological report of a 1933 expedition to South Rona with scientific colleagues. She spoke about her survey of the island at a meeting of the British Association in Aberdeen. The report was illustrated with several of her own photographs. She told a newspaper that she was "official photographer and cook" for the South Rona team. She created her own "lantern slides" for lectures, both for university lectures and for numerous talks to the public and to local associations, reported in the Dundee newspapers. One article said she was "well known as a brilliant and entertaining lecturer". She was also an exhibiting member of the Society of Scottish Artists.

In 1932 she started the Dundee Soroptimist Club, a group for professional women interested in good citizenship and service to others. Smith was the first president, and in 1935 she was elected president of the National Union of Soroptimist Clubs of Great Britain and Ireland. After a year she resigned that post for health reasons.

She was awarded a Doctor of Science degree from the University of Edinburgh in 1941 after presenting a thesis called Stelar Structure in the Dicotyledons. Around the same time she addressed the Royal Society of Edinburgh on Studies in the Vascular Anatomy of Trees and Herbs. She became a fellow of the Society in 1953 and two years later was appointed Head of the Department of Botany at the recently restructured Queen's College, Dundee. She retired in 1960 and died on 17 May 1976. A collection of her papers are held by the University of Dundee's Archives.

== Family ==
Edith Philip Smith was born in Stirling on 9 March 1897, the eldest child of Edith Abbot Philip and James Cruickshank Smith CBE LittD LLD. At that time J.C.Smith was Rector of Stirling High School, but for most of his career he was a senior chief inspector of schools as well as a literary scholar. The family moved away from Stirling in 1899 and lived in Glasgow, Perth and Fife. Smith's obituary described his wife as "sister of Lady Beveridge". Lady Beveridge was the name after her second marriage of Jessie (aka Janet) Thomson Mair née Philip. One of her children was anthropologist Lucy Philip Mair, a first cousin of Edith Philip Smith. Her mother and aunt were amongst the children of a well-educated Dundee joiner and builder running a successful business.

One of Edith's three sisters, Amy Moir Philip Pantin née Smith, trained as a zoologist, then became a doctor and member of the Medical Women's Federation. She was married to the zoologist Carl Pantin.

== Bibliography ==
- 1922 Comparative Studies on Respiration XXII. The Effect of Lactic Acid on the Respiration of Wheat, American Journal of Botany, Vol. 9, No. 6, pp307-310
- 1922 A Note on Conjugation in Zygnema, Annals of Botany
- 1924 The Effect of General Anaesthetics on the Respiration of Cereals. I. Carbon Dioxide Production, Annals of Botany
- 1927 The origin of adventitious growths in coleus, Transactions of the Botanical Society of Edinburgh
- 1927 The anatomy and propagation of Clematis, Transactions of the Botanical Society of Edinburgh
- 1928 A Comparative Study of the Stem Structure of the Genus Clematis, with special reference to Anatomical Changes induced by Vegetative Propagation, Transactions of the Botanical Society of Edinburgh
- 1930 Flower colours as natural indicators, Transactions of the Botanical Society of Edinburgh
- 1932 Experimental biology, Oxford
- 1933 The calibration of flower colour indicators, Protoplasma
- 1934 The Vegetation of South Rona, The Scottish Naturalist, no.210

Not a complete list.
