= Milne-Edwardsia =

Scientific classification
- Domain: Eukaryota
- Kingdom: Animalia
- Phylum: Cnidaria
- Subphylum: Anthozoa
- Class: Hexacorallia
- Order: Actiniaria
- Family: Edwardsiidae
- Genus: Milne-Edwardsia; Carlgren, 1892

Synonyms
- Milneedwardsia Carlgren, 1892

Genus of sea anemones

Milne-Edwardsia is a genus of cnidarians belonging to the family Edwardsiidae.

Species:

- Milne-Edwardsia andresi
- Milne-Edwardsia carneata
- Milne-Edwardsia fusca
