= Walter Heape =

British zoologist and embryologist

Walter Heape FRS (29 April 1855 – 10 September 1929) was a British zoologist and embryologist. Heape is known for the first successful mammalian embryo transfer.

== Early life ==
Heape was born 29 April 1855 in Brompton, London to a wealthy family. Until the age of seventeen, he was taught by a private tutor. He then attended Owens College for one year.

From 1873 to 1879, Heape worked for a rice and sugar milling firm, then a merchant firm, and finally a cotton spinning mill before his health deteriorated and he decided to pursue a scientific career. After briefly studying physiology at Arthur Gamgee's laboratory in Owens College and then botany at Marmaduke Alexander Lawson's laboratory in Oxford, Heape went to the University of Cambridge to study physiology under Michael Foster, botany under Sydney Howard Vines, and animal morphology under Francis Maitland Balfour. Heape received an honorary M.A. from Cambridge on 10 December 1885. From 1879 to 1882, Heape concentrated under Balfour on mammalian embryology until Balfour died in a mountain climbing accident.

== Career ==
In 1882, Heape became an instructor and demonstrator in animal morphology as an assistant to Adam Sedgwick and remained in that post until 1885. In May 1885, he was appointed the assistant secretary for the Marine Biological Association. On 14 December 1885, the association appointed him resident superintendent to oversee the construction of the marine laboratory at Plymouth and also to conduct surveys of the marine life near Plymouth. He carried out these duties until his resignation on 1 September 1887 due to disagreements with the association's secretary E. Ray Lankester.

Heape left Plymouth in March 1888 and then visited Egypt, Ceylon, India, Burma, and the Straits Settlements before returning to England in 1889. He was awarded a Royal Society Grant-in-Aid and a Balfour Studentship and in December 1889, left for India to collect early embryos from common langurs and rhesus monkeys. After only four months in India, Heape, suffering from illness, returned to England, having failed to collect any early embryos but being successful in preserving many female genital tract specimens of the primates.

On 27 April 1890, Heape (probably at a laboratory at his family home in Prestwich) transferred two Angora-fertilized ova from an Angora doe rabbit into the upper end of the fallopian tube of a Belgian Hare doe rabbit which had been fertilised three hours before by a Belgian Hare buck rabbit. The Belgian Hare doe gave birth on 29 May 1890 to four offspring which appeared to be of the Belgian Hare breed and two offspring which appeared to be of the Angora breed. The Angora young were true albinos, like their presumed parents. Heape was assisted in the surgical part of the experiment by Samuel Buckley, M.D. (Lond.), F.R.C.S. (Eng.).

Heape worked at Cambridge from 1891 to 1906. In November 1897 he published a second paper on his embryo transfer experiments. In 1906 Heape was elected F.R.S.

By focusing on Heape's embryo transfer experiments, one should not conclude that this work was his main contribution. In fact, he made four other important contributions to reproduction biology:

(i) the first detailed description of the uterine changes during the menstrual cycle in non-human primates (common langur and rhesus macaque: Heape, 1894, 1897b);

(ii) the formal description of reproductive cycles, including the language we use today to describe the oestrous cycle (Heape, 1900);

(iii) the epidemiology of infertility in farm animals, particularly sheep (Heape, 1899a, b); and

(iv) the discovery of nonspontaneous ovulation (Heape, 1905).

... Heape's contribution to 'applied' science included the rekindling of interest in artificial insemination (1897a, 1898) and the laying of a scientific foundation to the animal breeding industry with emphasis on its economic importance (1899, 1906). Heape's scientific heirs in reproductive physiology at Cambridge, F.H.A. Marshall and Sir John Hammond, judged (1946) his most important work to be his memoir on The Sexual Season of Mammals (1900), in which he brought together all that was then known about breeding seasons and oestrous cycles and introduced the very terms we use today in describing the phases of the cycle. Marshall (1930) also indicated Walter Heape's versatility in an obituary describing a career that included business endeavours, elephant hunting and the invention of a high-speed camera, the "Heape and Grylls Rapid Cinema Machine", in addition to his wide-ranging biological pursuits.

In 1918, Heape and Horace B. Grylls introduced their invention, the Heape and Grylls Rapid Cinema Machine, capable of taking from 500 to 5,000 pictures per second and useful for the study of shell bursts and armour penetration.

== Personal life ==
Heape married in 1891 and was the father of three children. He died on 10 September 1929 in Tunbridge Wells, Kent, England.

== Selected publications ==
- "The 'sexual season' of mammals and the relation of the "pro-œstrum" to menstruation". Quarterly Journal of Microscopical Science. New Series. 44 (173): 1–70. 1900.
- The Breeding Industry. National problems. University press. 1906.
- Sex Antagonism. G. P. Putnam's sons. 1913.
- Preparation for Marriage. 1914.
- Emigration, Migration and Nomadism. 1931; edited and with an introduction by F. H. A. Marshall
