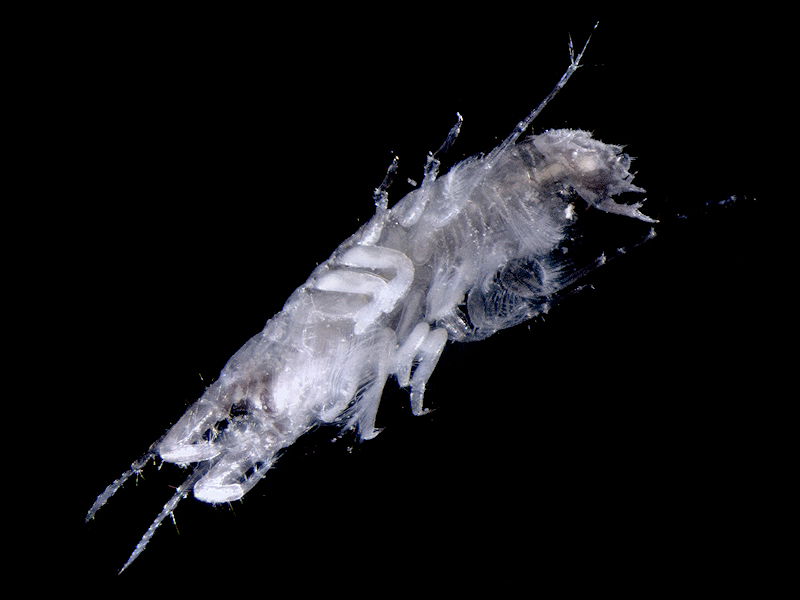
- Ventral view

Scientific classification
- Kingdom: Animalia
- Phylum: Arthropoda
- Clade: Pancrustacea
- Class: Malacostraca
- Order: Amphipoda
- Family: Corophiidae
- Genus: Monocorophium
- Species: M. insidiosum

Binomial name
- Monocorophium insidiosum (Crawford, 1937)

Synonyms
- Corophium insidiosum Crawford, 1937

= Monocorophium insidiosum =

Species of crustacean

Monocorophium insidiosum is a species of small amphipod crustacean commonly found in brackish, intertidal, and subtidial environments across Europe, Asia, and parts of North America. Monocorophium insidiosum is important in estuarine environments and benthic food webs because of its ecological versatility and tube-building habit.

== Description ==
Adults are about 4.5 mm in length.

== Distribution and habitat ==
Monocorophium insidiosum is found in estuarine and coastal environments. It is frequently seen in the English Channel, Mediterranean Sea, North Sea, Baltic Sea, and Japanese coastal regions. Reports have also confirmed its presence along parts of the American coastline. Monocorophium insidiosum favors high-turbidity conditions and lives on muddy or sandy substrates. Although the population decrease as salinity falls below 1 PSU (practical salinity units), population growth occurs in brackish water with salinities as low as 1.2–5.7 PSU.

== Behavior ==
Monocorophium insidiosum is known for its tube-building behavior. It constructs protective tubes using a mixture of organic material (such as algae and detritus) and inorganic particles (like sand), and are capable of building tubes entirely from material secreted by the organism.

These tubes allow the species to attach itself to hard substrates and prevents them from being washed away by currents and tides.

Monocorophium insidiosum can molt up to 20 times over its lifetime.

== Reproduction and life cycle ==
Monocorophium insidiosum exhibits multivoltine reproduction, producing multiple generations per year. Reproduction occurs year-round with seasonal peaks in spring and fall. Lifespan is typically 5–6 months, with cohorts born in the late summer usually living longer than those born in the spring. Females reach sexual maturity at around 2.2 mm in length and are more abundant in populations than males. Larger females tend to produce more eggs. Temperature influences the rate of development. Warmer temperatures accelerate growth and reproductive cycles but also reduce lifespan.

Males use their antennae to detect female pheromones and engage in precopulatory mate guarding by carrying females until molting occurs. Fertilization takes place within the female's brood pouch, where embryos develop into juveniles before being released.

Seasonal fluctuations affect population density, with numbers peaking in spring and summer and declining in fall and winter. Generations often overlap due to continuous reproductive activity.

== Ecology ==
Monocorophium insidiosum is an omnivorous suspension feeder but can also engage in deposit feeding. It consumes phytoplankton, algae, and organic detritus. Nair and Anger suggested that M. insidiosum might serve as an important food source for shrimp and young shorebirds.
