= Journal of the Marine Biological Association of the United Kingdom =

- Discipline: Marine biology
- Language: English
- Edited by: Jane Lewis

Publication details
- History: 1887–present
- Publisher: Cambridge University Press on behalf of the Marine Biological Association of the United Kingdom (United Kingdom)
- Frequency: 8/year
- Impact factor: 1.403 (2017)

Standard abbreviations
- ISO 4: J. Mar. Biol. Assoc. U. K.

Indexing
- ISSN: 0025-3154 (print); 1469-7769 (web)

Links
- Journal homepage

The Journal of the Marine Biological Association of the United Kingdom is a peer-reviewed scientific journal that was established in August 1887. Originally set up to provide members of the Marine Biological Association of the United Kingdom with "notes and reports concerning the work of the Association" along with "brief records of observations relating to the marine biology and fisheries of the coasts of the United Kingdom". Since 1937 the journal has been published by Cambridge University Press on behalf of the association. According to the Journal Citation Reports, the journal has a 2017 impact factor of 1.403.
