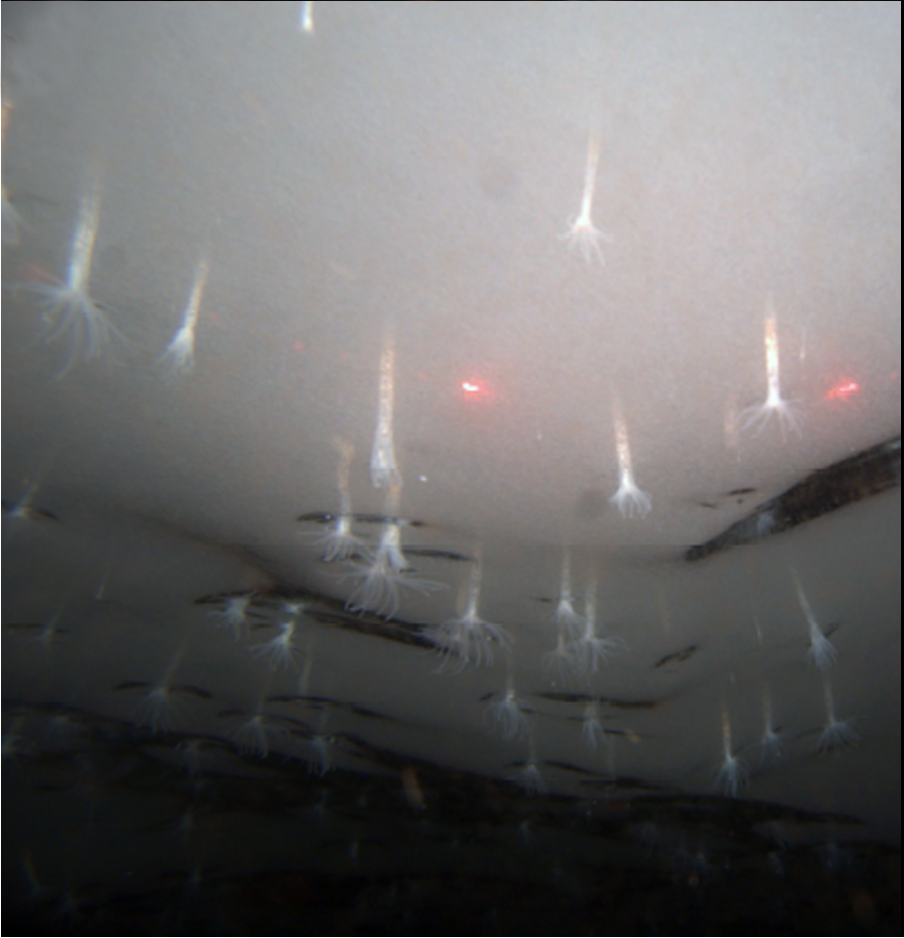
- Edwardsiella andrillae

Scientific classification
- Kingdom: Animalia
- Phylum: Cnidaria
- Subphylum: Anthozoa
- Class: Hexacorallia
- Order: Actiniaria
- Family: Edwardsiidae
- Genus: Edwardsiella; Andres, 1883

Species
- See text

Synonyms
- Fagesia Delphy, 1938; Favesia

= Edwardsiella (cnidarian) =

Genus of sea anemones

Edwardsiella is a genus of sea anemones in the family Edwardsiidae. It is named in honour of Henri Milne-Edwards, an eminent French zoologist.

== Species ==
The following species are listed by the World Register of Marine Species.

- Edwardsiella andrillae (Daly, Rack & Zook, 2013)
- Edwardsiella carnea (Gosse, 1856)
- Edwardsiella ignota (Carlgren, 1959)
- Edwardsiella janthina (Andrès, 1881)
- Edwardsiella lineata (Verrill in Baird, 1873)
- Edwardsiella loveni (Carlgren, 1892)
