= Endeavour (journal) =

- Discipline: History and Philosophy of Science
- Language: English
- Edited by: Edward Guimont; Sarah Pickman

Publication details
- History: 1942–present
- Publisher: Elsevier
- Frequency: Quarterly
- Impact factor: 0.500 (2017)

Standard abbreviations
- ISO 4: Endeavour

Indexing
- CODEN: ENDEAS
- ISSN: 0160-9327 (print); 1873-1929 (web)
- LCCN: 44005904
- OCLC no.: 1567873

Links
- Journal homepage

Endeavour is a quarterly peer-reviewed academic journal published by Elsevier. It began as a scientific review publication published by Imperial Chemical Industries in 1942, and since has evolved into a scholarly journal covering the fields of history and philosophy of science, technology, and medicine. Its co-editors-in-chief are Edward Guimont (Bristol Community College) and Sarah Pickman.

== History ==
The journal was established during World War II, releasing its first issue in January 1942. It began as a scientific review journal published by the public relations department of Imperial Chemical Industries, with support from the British government. It was initially published in English, French, German, and Spanish editions. It later added an Italian edition. Through the 1940s, 1950s, and 1960s, the journal was distributed to scientists and academic libraries around Europe in an effort to promote scientific internationalism. ICI continued to run the journal as its house technical publication until January 1977, when it became the property of Pergamon Press, a commercial publisher. Pergamon then started renumbering the volumes, starting with volume 1 in 1977. Elsevier acquired Pergamon Press in 1991 and has published the journal since.

In the 1990s, Endeavour moved away from publishing scientific reviews and began to focus on the history of science. It is now commonly listed among journals in history, STS, and HPS.

== Abstracting and indexing ==
The journal is abstracted and indexed by:

- BIOSIS
- Elsevier BIOBASE
- Chemical Abstracts
- Current Contents/Agriculture, Biology & Environmental Sciences
- Current Contents/Engineering, Computing & Technology
- Current Contents/Life Sciences
- Current Contents/Physics, Chemical, & Earth Sciences
- Current Contents/SciSearch Database
- Current Contents/Social & Behavioral Sciences
- Current Technology Index
- Geo Bib & Index
- Research Alert
- Scopus

According to the Journal Citation Reports, the journal has a 2017 impact factor of 0.500.
