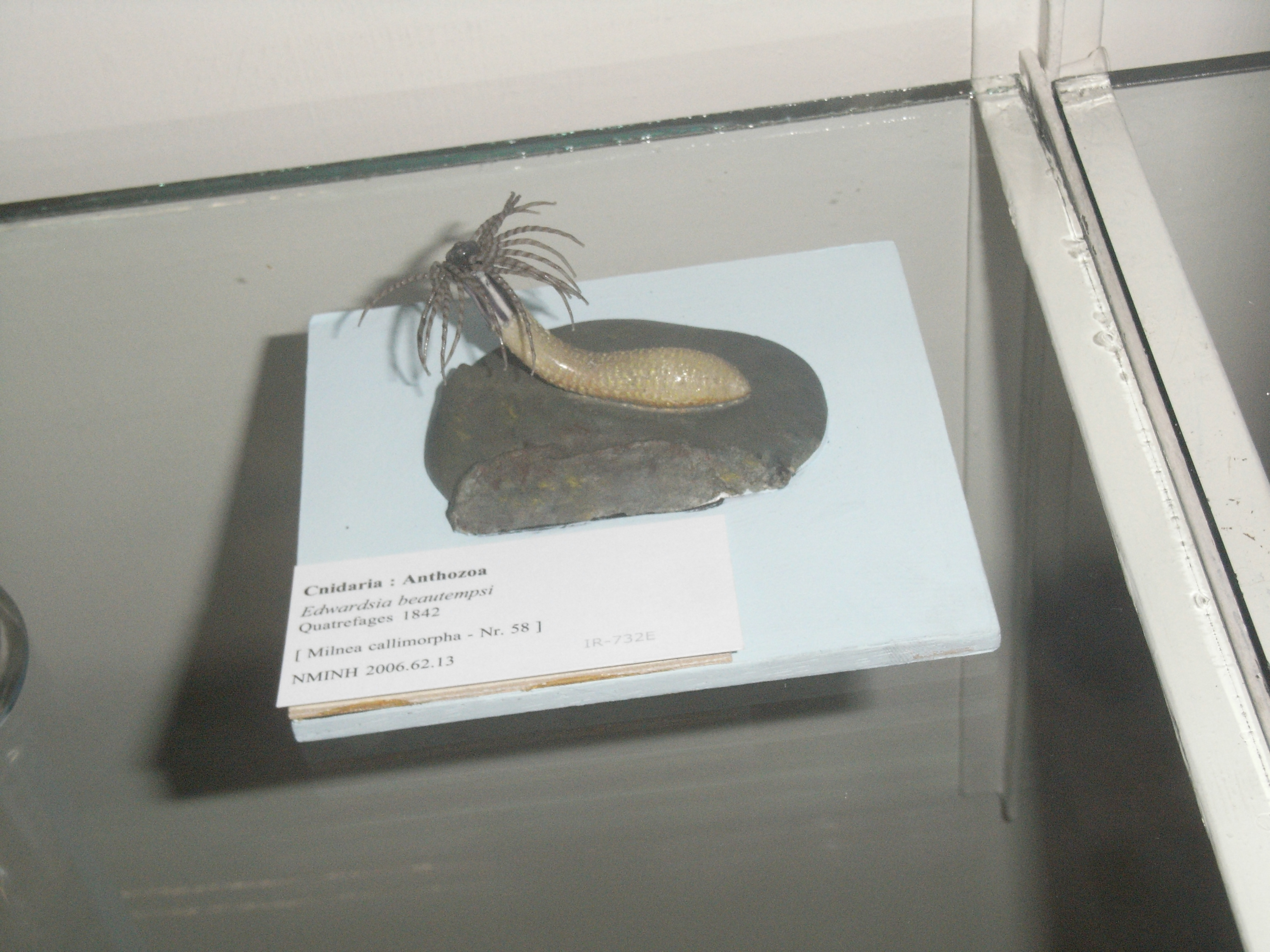
- Model of Edwardsia beautempsii

Scientific classification
- Domain: Eukaryota
- Kingdom: Animalia
- Phylum: Cnidaria
- Subphylum: Anthozoa
- Class: Hexacorallia
- Order: Actiniaria
- Family: Edwardsiidae
- Genus: Edwardsia de Quatrefages, 1842

Synonyms
- List: Diphtera Sluiter, 1888; Edwardisa; Edwardsa; Edwardsioides; Edwarsia

= Edwardsia =

Genus of sea anemones

Edwardsia is a genus of sea anemones, the type of the family Edwardsiidae. They have eight mesenteries and live in tubes in the sand. The name, in Neo-Latin, commemorates the French zoologist Henri Milne-Edwards.

The genus contains the following species:

- Edwardsia allmani McIntosh, 1866
- Edwardsia alternobomen Izumi & Fujita, 2019
- Edwardsia andresi Danielssen, 1890
- Edwardsia annamensis Carlgren, 1943
- Edwardsia arctica Carlgren, 1921
- Edwardsia arenosa Klunzinger, 1877
- Edwardsia athalyei England, 1990
- Edwardsia beautempsii Quatrefages, 1842
- Edwardsia californica (McMurrich, 1913)
- Edwardsia capensis Carlgren, 1938
- Edwardsia carlgreni Carlgren, 1921
- Edwardsia claparedii (Panceri, 1869)
- Edwardsia clavata (Rathke, 1843)
- Edwardsia collaris Stimpson, 1856
- Edwardsia coriacea Moseley, 1877
- Edwardsia costata Danielssen, 1890
- Edwardsia danica Carlgren, 1921
- Edwardsia delapiae Carlgren & Stephenson, 1928
- Edwardsia duodecemtentaculata Carlgren, 1931
- Edwardsia elegans Verrill, 1869
- Edwardsia finmarchica Carlgren, 1921
- Edwardsia flaccida Marion, 1882
- Edwardsia fusca Danielssen, 1890
- Edwardsia goodsiri M'Intosh, 1866
- Edwardsia handi Daly & Ljubenkov, 2008
- Edwardsia inachi Sanamyan, Sanamyan & Schories, 2015
- Edwardsia incerta Carlgren, 1921
- Edwardsia isimangaliso Daly et al., 2012
- Edwardsia islandica Carlgren, 1921
- Edwardsia ivelli Manuel, 1975
- Edwardsia japonica Carlgren, 1931
- Edwardsia jonesii Seshaiya & Cuttress, 1969
- Edwardsia juliae Daly & Ljubenkov, 2008
- Edwardsia kameruniensis Carlgren, 1927
- Edwardsia longicornis Carlgren, 1921
- Edwardsia mammillata Bourne, 1916
- Edwardsia maroccana Carlgren, 1931
- Edwardsia mcmurrichi Daly & Ljubenkov, 2008
- Edwardsia meridionalis Williams, 1981
- Edwardsia migottoi Gusmão, Brandão & Daly, 2016
- Edwardsia neozelanica Farquhar, 1898
- Edwardsia norvegica Carlgren, 1942
- Edwardsia novazelanica Farquhar, 1898
- Edwardsia octoplax (Sluiter, 1888)
- Edwardsia octoradiata Carlgren, 1931
- Edwardsia olguini Daly & Ljubenkov, 2008
- Edwardsia perdita Williams, 1981
- Edwardsia profunda Daly & Ljubenkov, 2008
- Edwardsia rigida Marion, 1882
- Edwardsia rubricollum Stimpson, 1856
- Edwardsia rugosa Bourne, 1916
- Edwardsia sanctaehelenae Carlgren, 1941
- Edwardsia scabra Marion, 1882
- Edwardsia sipunculoides (Stimpson, 1853)
- Edwardsia sojabio Sanamyan N. & Sanamyan K., 2013
- Edwardsia sulcata Verrill, 1864
- Edwardsia tecta Haddon, 1889
- Edwardsia timida Quatrefages, 1842
- Edwardsia tinctrix Annandale, 1915
- Edwardsia tuberculata Duben & Koren, 1847
- Edwardsia vegae Carlgren, 1921
- Edwardsia vitrea (Danielssen, 1890)
- Edwardsia vivipara Carlgren, 1950
- Edwardsia willeyana Bourne, 1916
