= Carl Pantin =

British zoologist

Carl Frederick Abel Pantin FRS (30 March 1899 – 14 January 1967) was a British zoologist. He was educated at Tonbridge School and Christ's College, Cambridge.

In 1937, he won the Trail Medal of the Linnean Society, was elected a Fellow of the Royal Society in 1937, won one of its Royal Medals in 1950. Pantin was president of the Linnean Society 1958 - 1961, and won the Linnean Medal, with Richard E. Holttum, in 1964. He was Professor of Zoology, Cambridge University from 1959 to 1966, and president of the Marine Biological Association from 1960 to 1966.

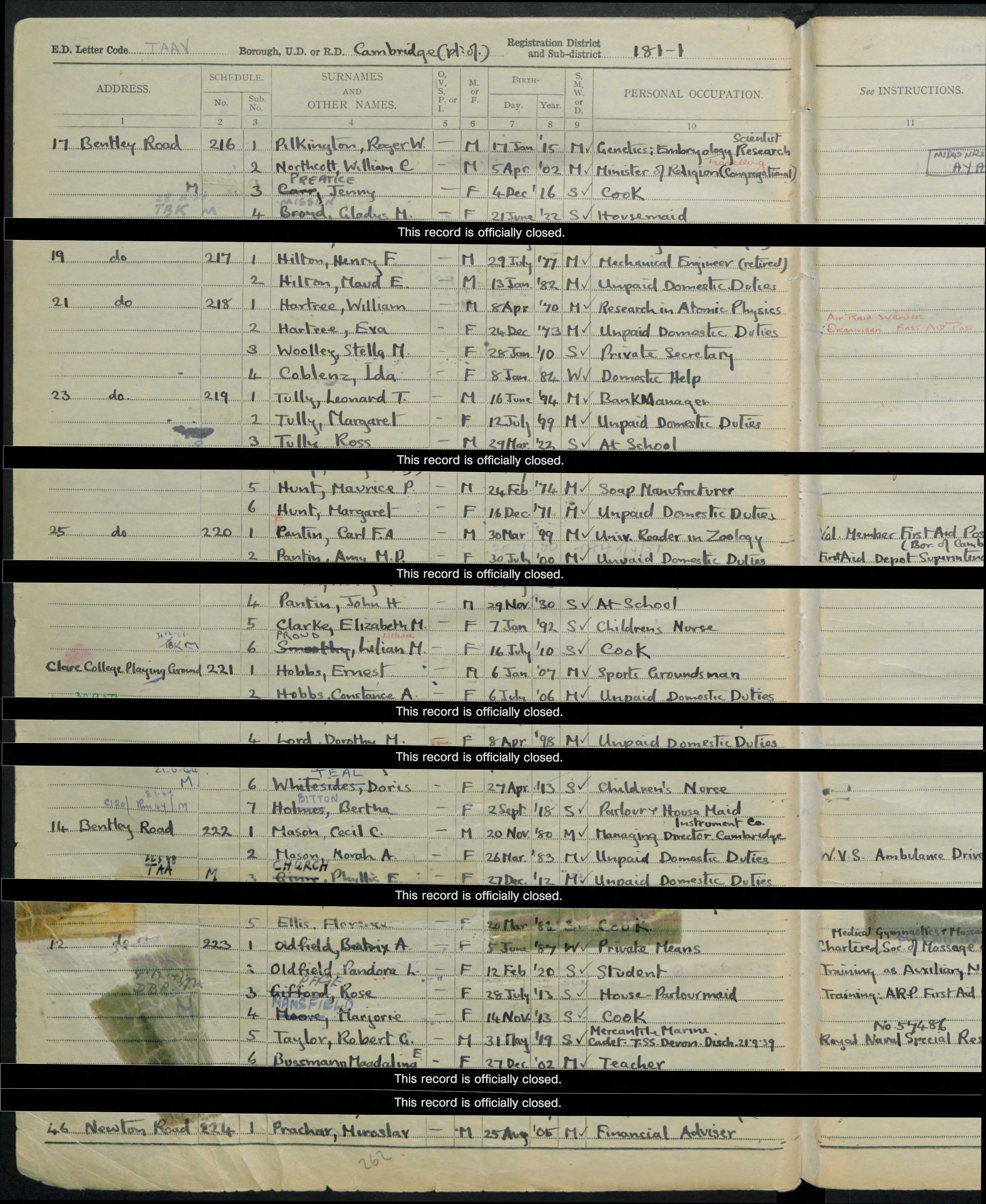
Carl and Amy as residents at 65 Bentley Road, Cambridge on the 1939 Register

Pantin was married to Amy Moir Philip Smith (see image of 1939 register), the sister of botanist Edith Philip Smith.

== Cosmo-Darwinism ==
Pointing to the serendipitous qualities for the emergence of life of such substances as carbon and water, Pantin in 1965 postulated the existence of multiple universes, from which ours had been selected on a principle “analogous to the principle of Natural Selection” - an early anticipation of the anthropic principle.
