= African Invertebrates =

Scientific journal

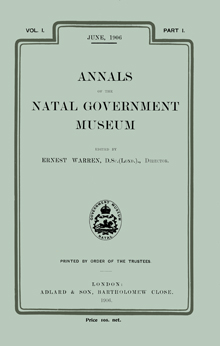
- Cover of first issue
- Discipline: Zoology, paleontology, systematics
- Language: English
- Edited by: John Midgley

Publication details
- Former names: Annals of the Natal Government Museum, Annals of the Natal Museum
- History: 1906–present
- Publisher: Pensoft Publishers on behalf of the KwaZulu-Natal Museum (South Africa)
- Frequency: Biannual
- Open access: Yes
- License: CC-BY-4.0
- Impact factor: 0.8 (2025)

Standard abbreviations
- ISO 4: Afr. Invertebr.

Indexing
- CODEN: ANMUA9
- ISSN: 1681-5556 (print); 2305-2562 (web)
- LCCN: 2002229168
- OCLC no.: 48877367

Links
- Journal homepage; Online access; Online archive

African Invertebrates is a peer-reviewed open access scientific journal that covers the taxonomy, systematics, biogeography, ecology, conservation, and palaeontology of Afrotropical invertebrates, whether terrestrial, freshwater, or marine. As from 2016, it is published by Pensoft Publishers on behalf of the KwaZulu-Natal Museum and the editor-in-chief is John M. Midgley (KwaZulu-Natal Museum).

== History ==
The journal was established in 1906 as the Annals of the Natal Government Museum and after 1910 renamed to Annals of the Natal Museum. In 1989, the journal stopped publishing archaeological and anthropological papers, which was split of to a new journal, the Natal Museum Journal of Humanities (later: Southern African Humanities), while the Annals of the Natal Museum were restricted to the natural sciences. The journal obtained its name in 2001 when its scope was limited to the study of invertebrates.

== Abstracting and indexing ==
The journal is abstracted and indexed in:

- BIOSIS Previews
- Embase
- GeoRef
- Science Citation Index Expanded
- Scopus
- The Zoological Record

== See also ==
- List of zoology journals
