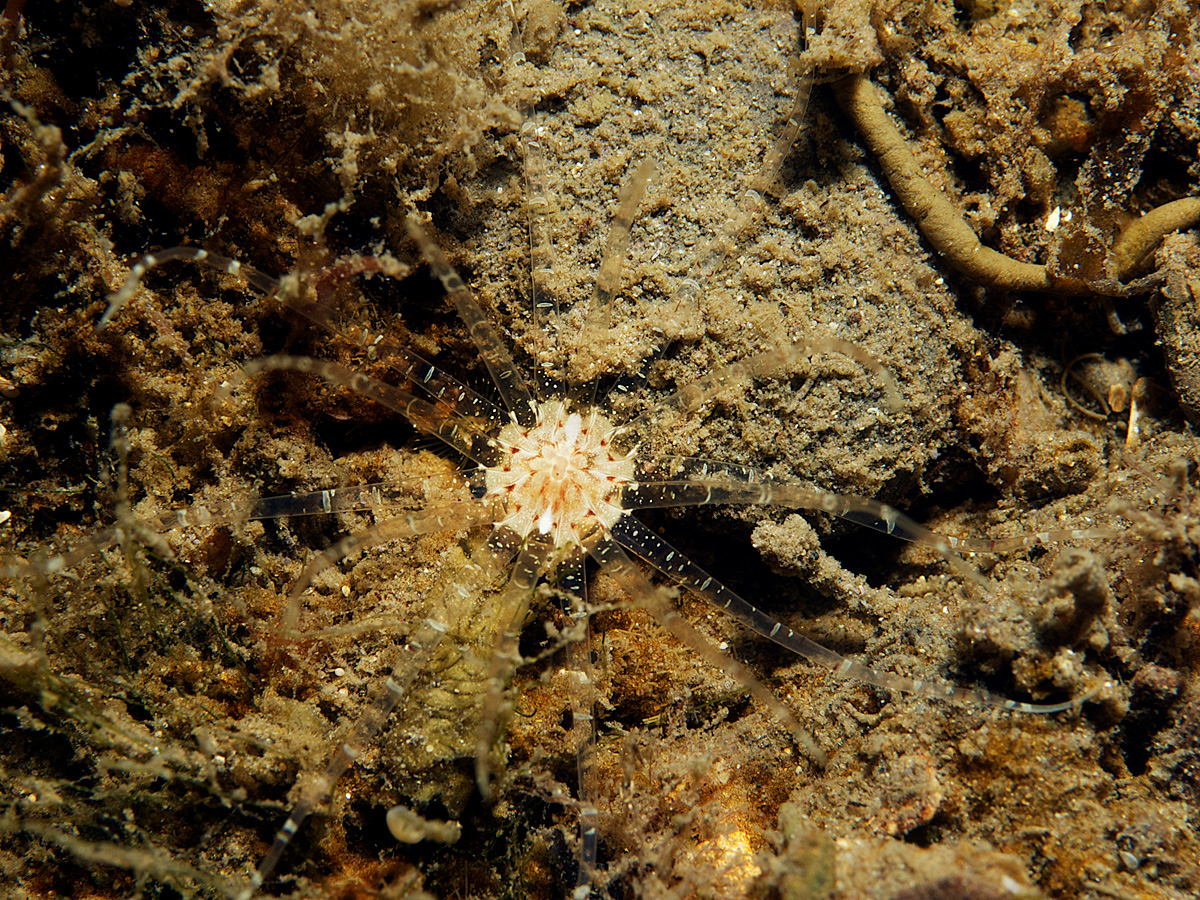
- The sea anemone Edwardsia claparedii at Valentia Island, County Kerry, Ireland.

Scientific classification
- Kingdom: Animalia
- Phylum: Cnidaria
- Subphylum: Anthozoa
- Class: Hexacorallia
- Order: Actiniaria
- Superfamily: Edwardsioidea
- Family: Edwardsiidae; Andres, 1881

Genera
- See text

= Edwardsiidae =

Family of sea anemones

Edwardsiidae is a family of sea anemones. Edwardsiids have long thin bodies and live buried in sediments or in holes or crevices in rock.

== Genera ==
The following genera are recognized within the family Edwardsiidae.

- Drillactis Verrill, 1922
- Edwardsia Quatrefages, 1842
- Edwardsianthus England, 1987
- Edwardsiella Andres, 1883
- Halcampogeton Carlgren, 1937
- Isoedwardsia Carlgren, 1900
- Milne-Edwardsia Carlgren, 1892
- Nematostella Stephenson, 1935
- Paraedwardsia Carlgren in Nordgaard, 1905
- Scolanthus Gosse, 1853
- Synhalcampella
- Tempuractis
