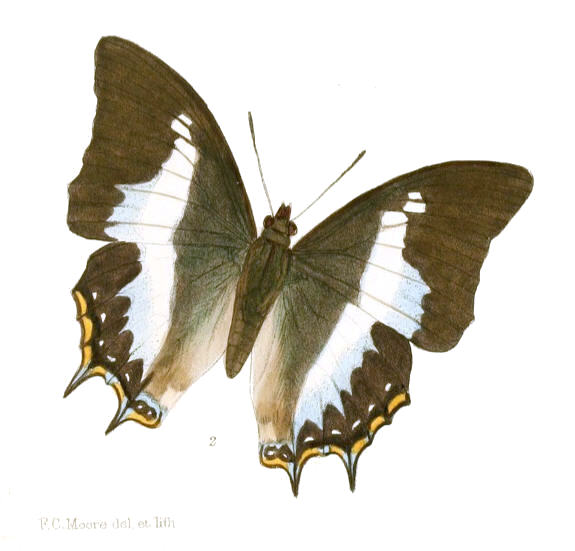
- Polyura schreiber wardii
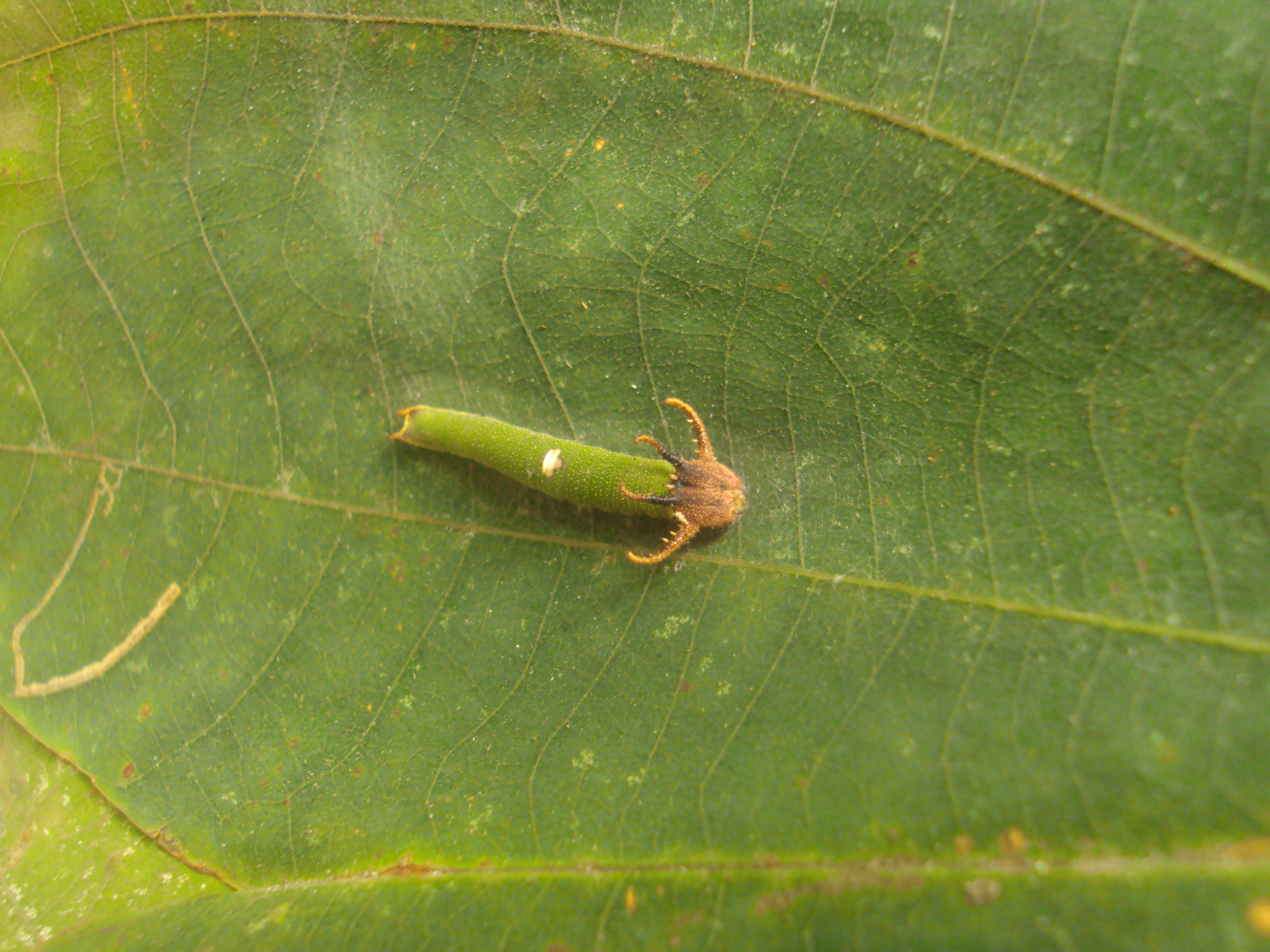
- Larva

Scientific classification
- Kingdom: Animalia
- Phylum: Arthropoda
- Clade: Pancrustacea
- Class: Insecta
- Order: Lepidoptera
- Family: Nymphalidae
- Genus: Polyura
- Species: P. schreiber

Binomial name
- Polyura schreiber (Godart, [1824])

Synonyms
- Polyura schreiberi (unjustified emendation)

= Polyura schreiber =

Blue nawab

Species of butterfly

Polyura schreiber, the blue nawab, is a butterfly species found in tropical Asia. It belongs to the Charaxinae (rajahs and nawabs) in the brush-footed butterfly family (Nymphalidae). It occurs from south India and Assam through Myanmar, Tenasserim, and Southeast Asia to southern China and to Java, Indonesia.

== Description ==
=== Polyura schreiber wardii ===
The South Indian subspecies:

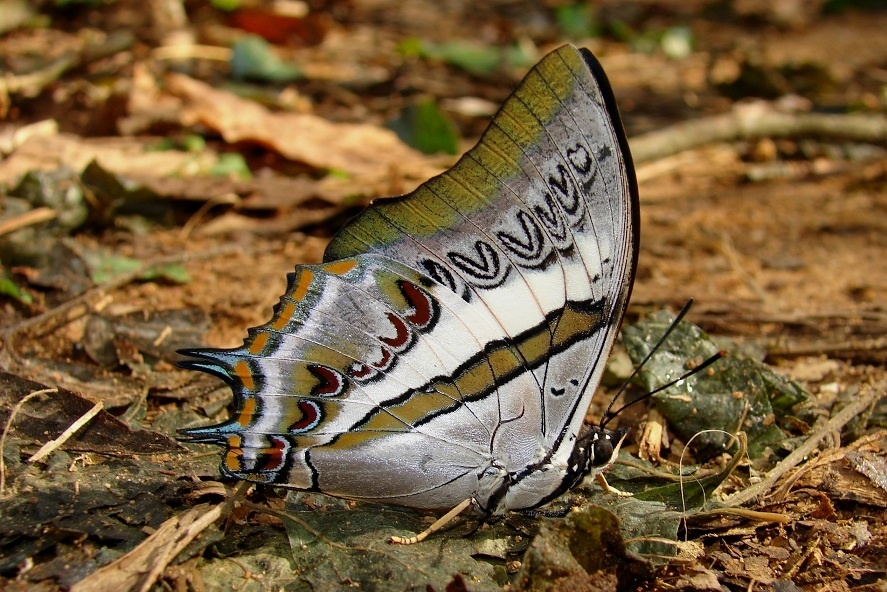
Blue nawab

Male has upperside ground colour black, glossed slightly with dull indigo-blue, or, in some specimens, light green at the base of the wings. Forewings and hindwings with a broad white discal bar from interspace 4 in forewing to just below the apex of the median vein in the hindwing, narrowing on the latter wing to a point. This bar has, on the outer side on both forewings and hindwings, an irregular border of small-blue, which is narrowest anteriorly and broadens posteriorly respectively on both forewings and hindwings. Forewing with, in addition, a white rectangular spot in interspace 5 and a small whitish speck above it. Hindwing with a subterminal row of small white dots, a terminal row of deep ochraceous spots, and some small-blue markings on the tails and margins near the tornal angle. Underside pearly white, broadly brownish pink along the dorsal margin of hindwing. Forewing: two black spots at base of cell; a broad olive-green band edged on both sides with black, followed by a discal bluish-white band, as on the upperside, and continuation of that on the forewing, terminating on vein 1, followed by a broad discal, posteriorly narrowing, white bar as on the upperside. Beyond this a postdiscal series of deep Indian-red lunules, placed on an olive-green ground, and margined on the inner side by an interrupted broad black line; finally, a sub-terminal narrow green band and terminal ochraceous lunules. Tails black touched with small-blue; above tornal angle a black line from vein 1 to dorsum. Antennae, head, thorax and abdomen black; thorax and abdomen on the sides and beneath whitish.

Female. Differs very slightly from the male; but can be distinguished at once by the greater width of the transverse discal band, and also by the two spots above it being larger and joined onto the band.

Wingspan: 92–116 mm.

=== Polyura schreiber assamensis ===
From Assam to Yunnan and through Southeast Asia to Thailand.

Typically lacks the spots in interspaces 5 and 7 of the forewing, but a specimen from Shillong in the British Museum has these spots, only they are placed prominently in echelon with one another as in the form from the Malay Peninsula, Borneo and Sumatra. Burmese and Tenasserim specimens resemble the Assam ones.

=== Immature stages ===
The Caterpillar is green, with a yellow band on 7th segment. The head is enlarged and ornate with four curved and tuberculated processes. The Pupa is green, with a longitudinal row of red dots on each side.

== Ecology ==
Known larval food plants are Rourea santaloides, Wagatea spicata and Bauhinia phoenicea.
