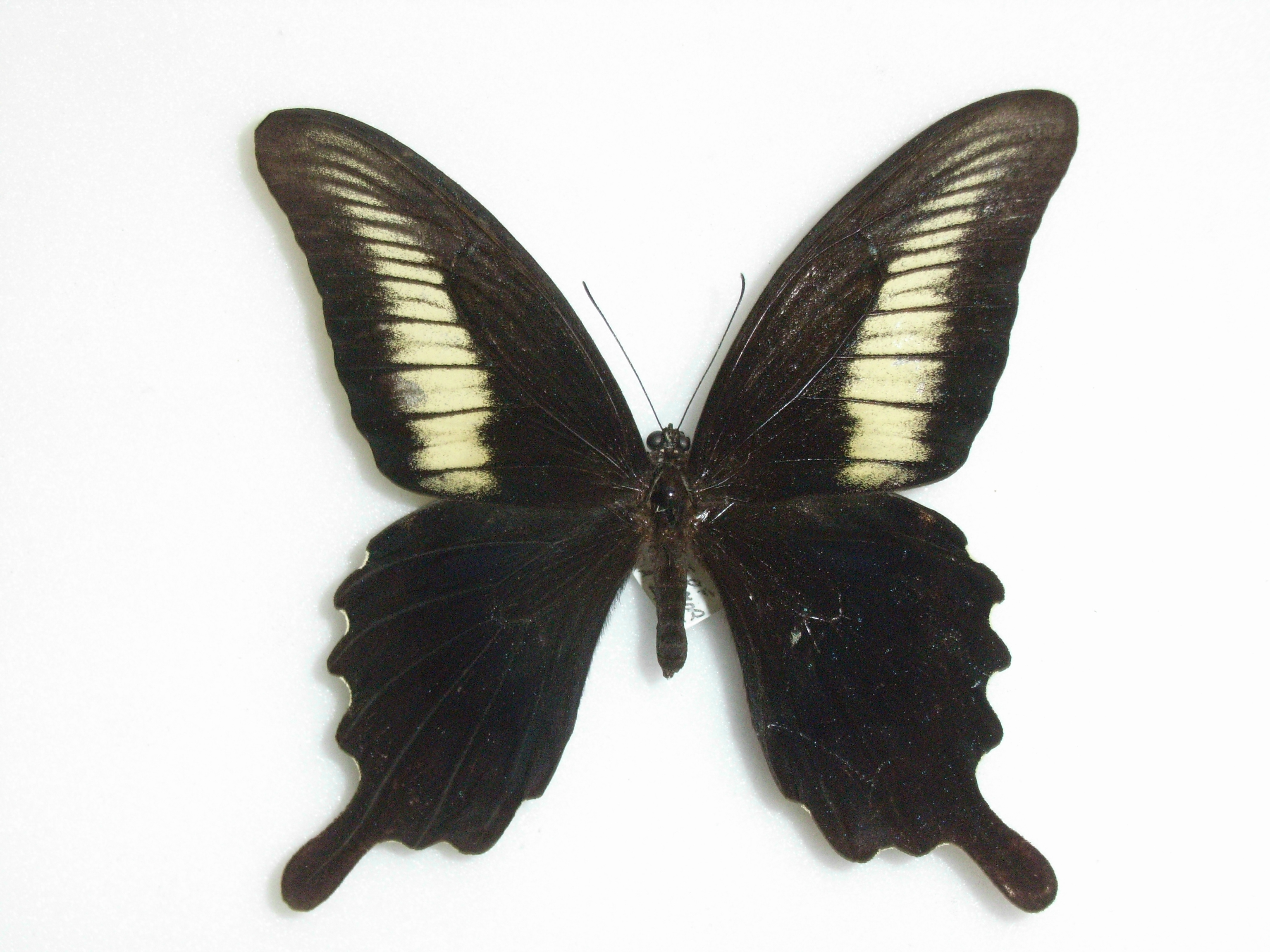

Scientific classification
- Kingdom: Animalia
- Phylum: Arthropoda
- Clade: Pancrustacea
- Class: Insecta
- Order: Lepidoptera
- Family: Papilionidae
- Genus: Papilio
- Species: P. oenomaus

Binomial name
- Papilio oenomaus Godart, 1819

Synonyms
- Menelaides oenomaus

= Papilio oenomaus =

Species of butterfly

Papilio oenomaus is a butterfly of the family Papilionidae. It is found on Timor and surrounding islands.

The wingspan is 120–130 mm. Black, tailed, entirely without blue scaling, the forewing elongate. Male forewing parallel with the distal margin with broad discal band which is pale yellow above, grey-white beneath; hindwing above without markings, beneath with a single row of yellowish red submarginal spots, which are remote from the cell and are sometimes indicated above also, and with 3 red basal patches. In the female the disc and cell of the forewing are semitransparent, the band is paler and the red basal patch, which in the male is only present beneath, is developed above also; on the hindwing a median band, which is reddish at its edges, the red submarginal spots above and beneath large, and the marginal spots reddish. The female is very similar to P. liris (Atrophaneura liris), and flies together with it. — oenomaus Godt. (28 b). occurs on Timor, Moa, Kisser and Roma (most probably also on the other small islands between Timor and Tenimber). The female with broad median band on the hindwing. Whilst P. liris is different on almost all the islands, oenomaus apparently shows no differences either in male or female on those mentioned above. On the other hand the following subspecies follows its model. — subfasciatus Rothsch. (28 b), from Wetter, is distinguished in the female by a very narrow, incomplete discal band on the hindwing, just as P. liris wettensis. This band is above and beneath pale red and usually interrupted before the cell, sometimes it is only faintly indicated beneath between costa and cell. The males are not constantly different to oenomaus; in general they have the band of the forewing somewhat narrower.

== Subspecies ==
- Papilio oenomaus oenomaus (Timor, Leti, Moa, Kissar, Romang Islands)
- Papilio oenomaus subfasciatus Rothschild, 1895 (Wetar)
