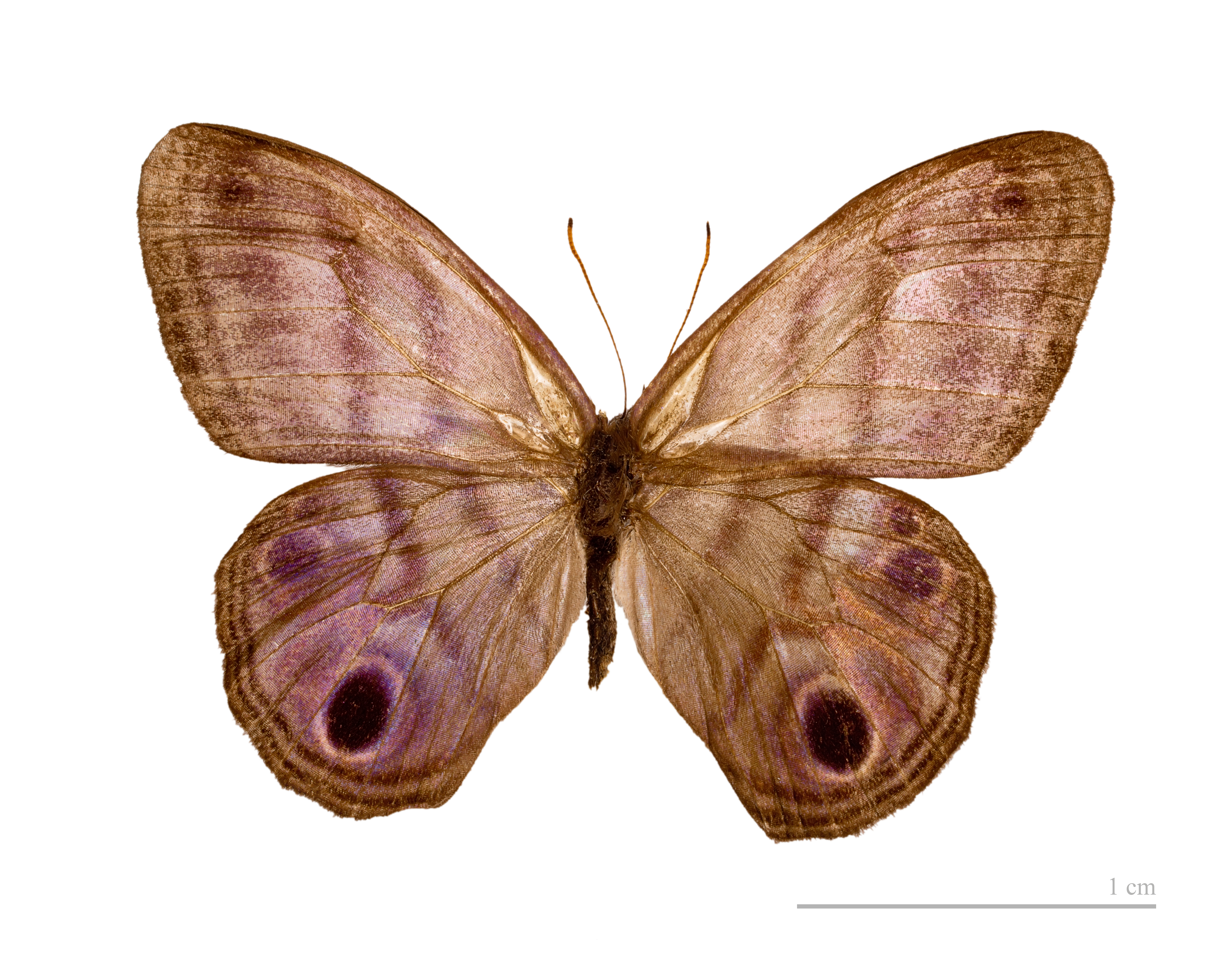
- Dorsal side
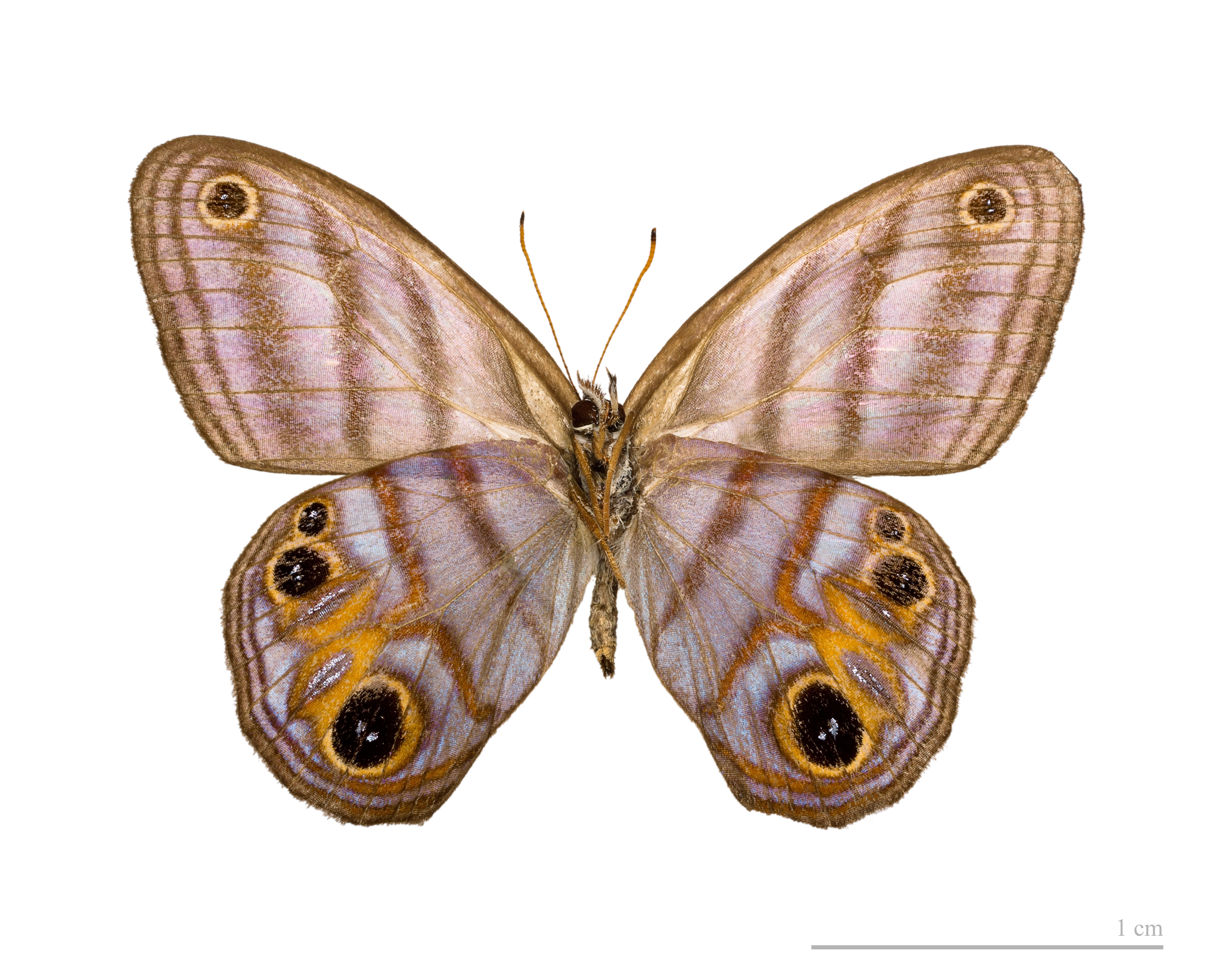
- Ventral side

Scientific classification
- Kingdom: Animalia
- Phylum: Arthropoda
- Class: Insecta
- Order: Lepidoptera
- Family: Nymphalidae
- Genus: Chloreuptychia
- Species: C. herseis

Binomial name
- Chloreuptychia herseis (Godart, [1824])

Synonyms
- Satyrus herseis Godart, [1824]; Papilio herse Cramer, [1775] (preocc. Hufnagel, 1766); Euptychia herse peruviana Prüffer, 1922; Euptychia herse f. bellatula d'Almeida, 1922

= Chloreuptychia herseis =

Species of butterfly

Chloreuptychia herseis is a species of butterfly in the family Nymphalidae. It is found in Suriname, Guyana, Peru and Brazil (Rio de Janeiro).
