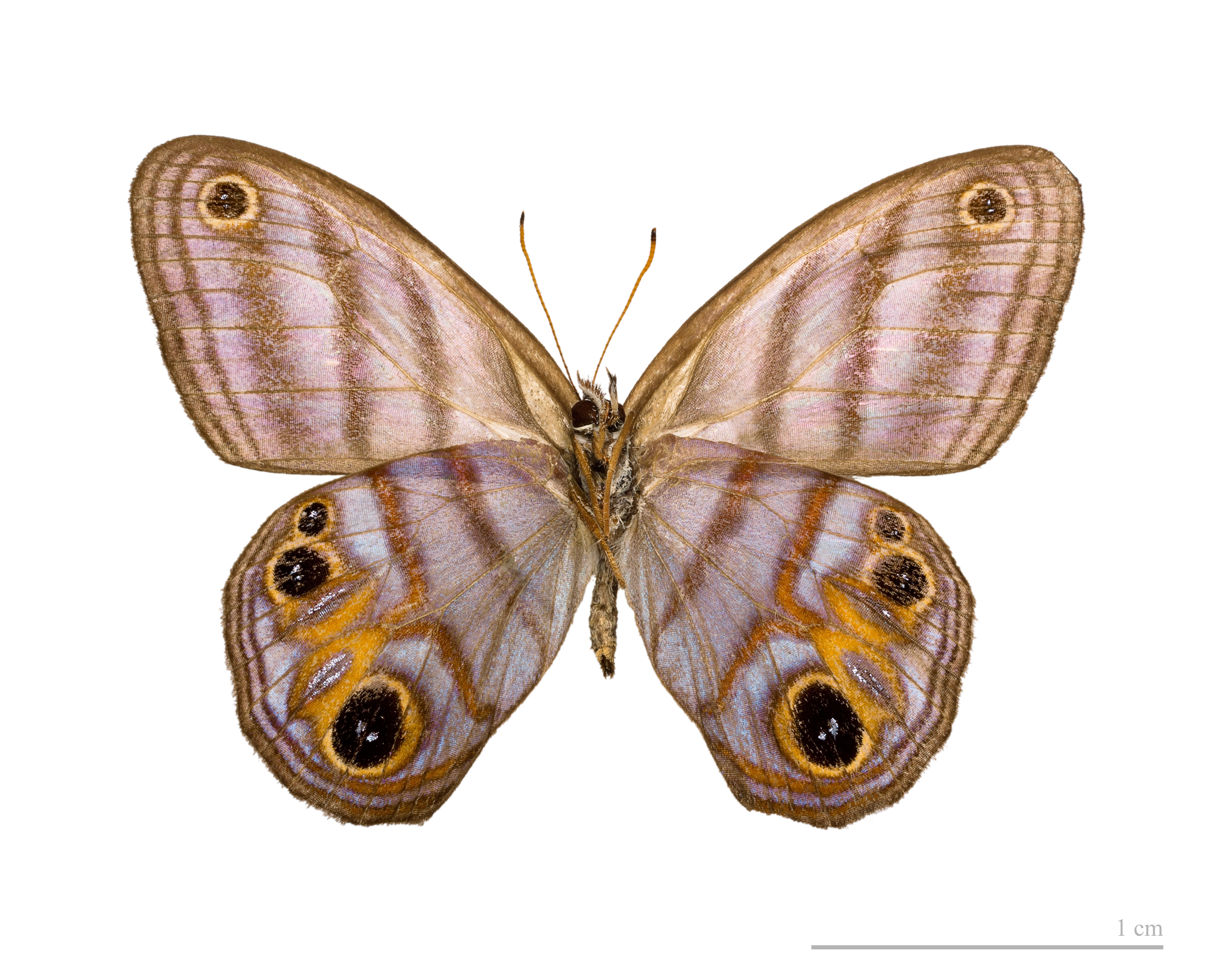
- Chloreuptychia herseis - MHNT

Scientific classification
- Kingdom: Animalia
- Phylum: Arthropoda
- Class: Insecta
- Order: Lepidoptera
- Family: Nymphalidae
- Subfamily: Satyrinae
- Tribe: Satyrini
- Subtribe: Euptychiina
- Genus: Chloreuptychia; Forster, 1964

= Chloreuptychia =

Genus of butterflies

Chloreuptychia is a genus of satyrid butterfly found in the Neotropical realm.

== Species ==
Listed alphabetically:

- Chloreuptychia agatha (Butler, 1867)
- Chloreuptychia callichloris (Butler, 1867)
- Chloreuptychia catharina (Staudinger, [1886])
- Chloreuptychia chlorimene (Hübner, [1819])
- Chloreuptychia herseis (Godart, [1824])
- Chloreuptychia hewitsonii (Butler, 1867)
- Chloreuptychia marica (Weymer, 1911)
- Chloreuptychia sericeella (Bates, 1865)
- Chloreuptychia tolumnia (Cramer, 1777)

== Gallery ==
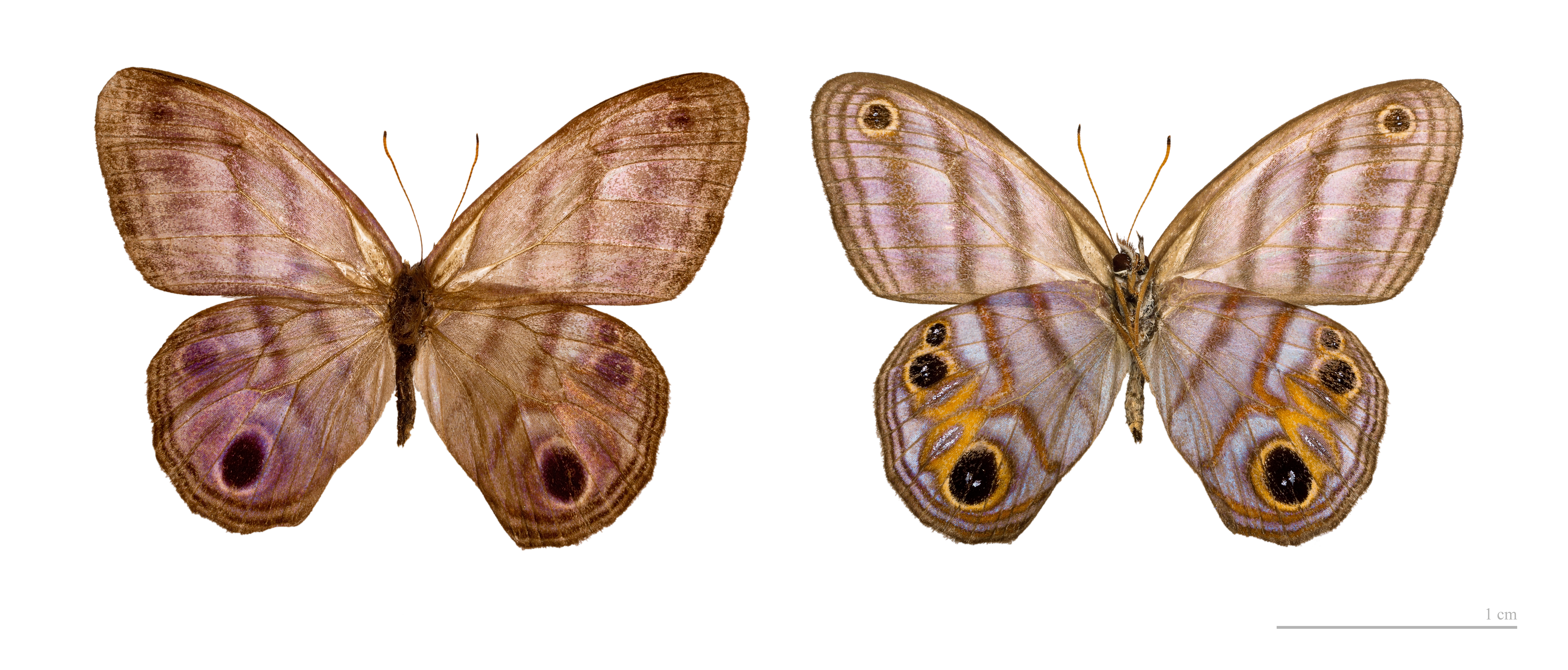
Chloreuptychia herseis - MHNT

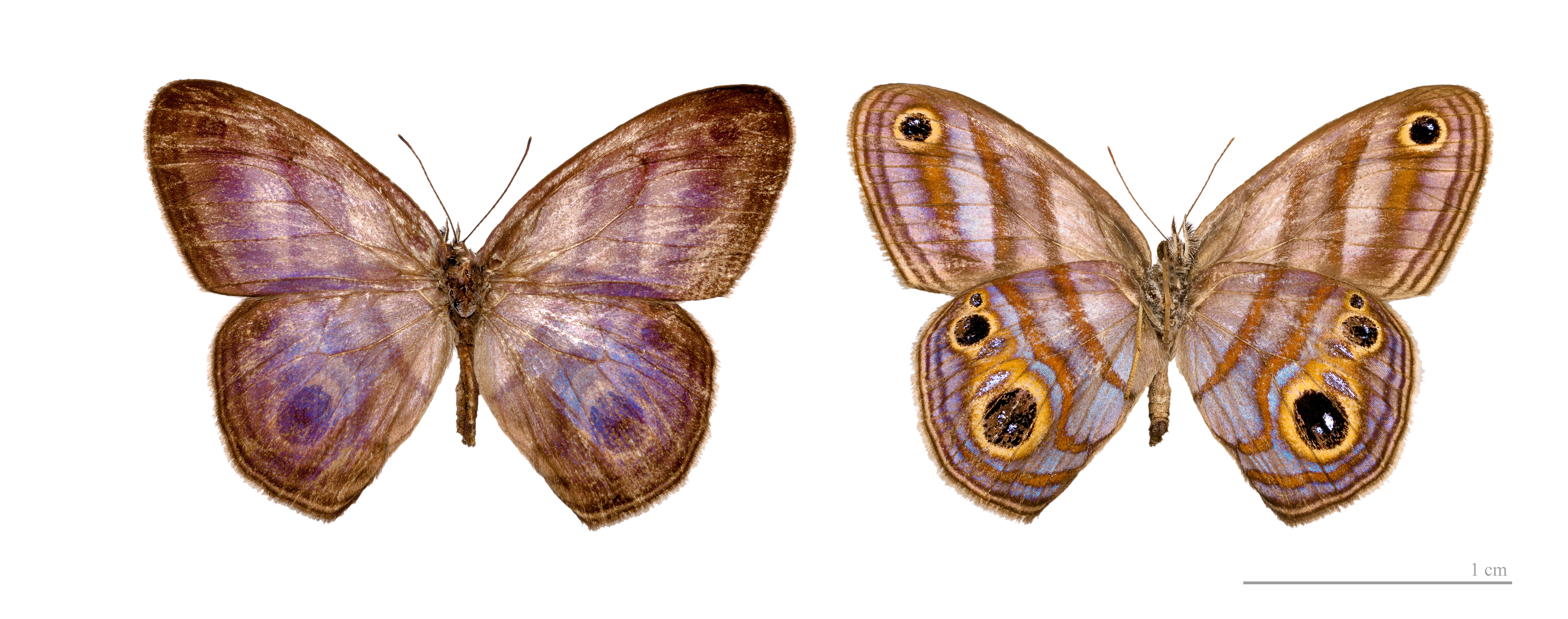
Chloreuptychia hewitsonii - MHNT
