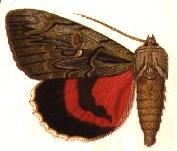

Scientific classification
- Kingdom: Animalia
- Phylum: Arthropoda
- Class: Insecta
- Order: Lepidoptera
- Superfamily: Noctuoidea
- Family: Erebidae
- Genus: Catocala
- Species: C. sultana

Binomial name
- Catocala sultana A. Bang-Haas, 1910

Synonyms
- Catocala optata sultana

= Catocala sultana =

Species of moth

Catocala sultana is a moth of the family Erebidae. It is found in Tunisia, Morocco and Algeria.

Some authors consider it a subspecies (Catocala optata sultana) or even a form of Catocala optata.
