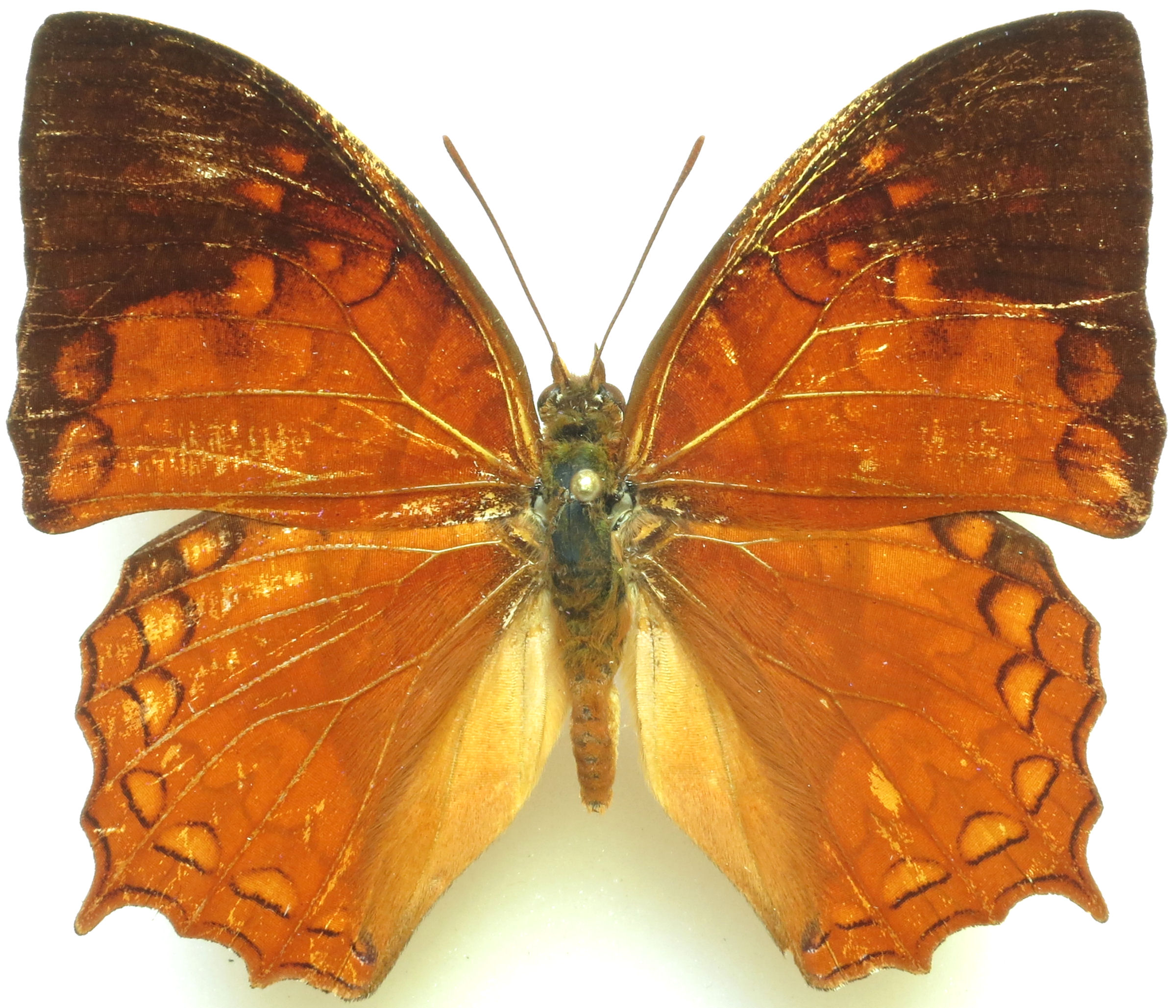
- C. p. congoensis specimen from CAR
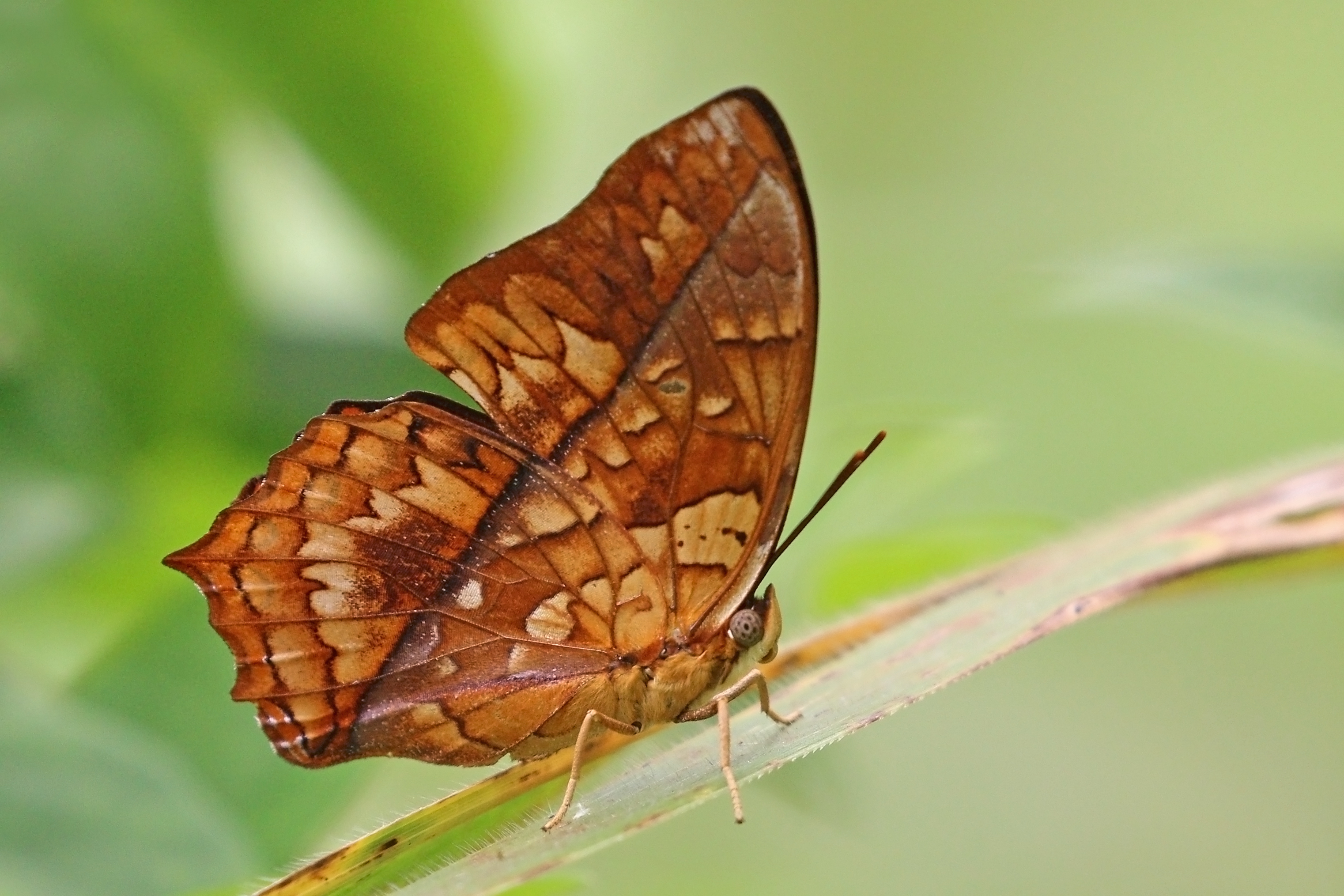
- male C. p. pleione Bobiri Forest, Ghana

Scientific classification
- Kingdom: Animalia
- Phylum: Arthropoda
- Clade: Pancrustacea
- Class: Insecta
- Order: Lepidoptera
- Family: Nymphalidae
- Subfamily: Charaxinae
- Tribe: Charaxini
- Genus: Charaxes
- Species: C. pleione

Binomial name
- Charaxes pleione (Godart, 1824)

Synonyms
- Nymphalis pleione Godart, 1824; Philognoma lichas Doubleday, 1849; Charaxes lichas ab. othello Suffert, 1904; Charaxes lichas bebra Rothschild, 1900; Charaxes pleione ab. pallida Lathy, 1925

= Charaxes pleione =

Common orange charaxes

Species of butterfly

Charaxes pleione, the common orange charaxes, or square-winged red charaxes, is a butterfly in the family Nymphalidae. It is found in Guinea, Sierra Leone, Liberia, Ivory Coast, Ghana, Nigeria, Cameroon, Gabon, the Republic of the Congo, the Central African Republic, Angola, the Democratic Republic of the Congo, Uganda, Kenya, Rwanda and Tanzania.

== Description ==
Hindwing between the anal angle and vein 4 nearly straight, at vein 2 feebly angled but not tailed, at vein 4 with a short tail, only about 3 mm (0.12 in) in length. Wings above red-brown; apex and distal margin of the forewing more or less broadly black. Wings beneath with a common dark transverse line, extending from the costal margin of the forewing, just before the apex, to the anal angle of the hindwing. Costal margin of the forewing beneath in cellule 12 white or whitish to the end of the cell.-lichas Dbl. male The black colour of the apical area of the forewing extends to the apex of the cell and is either spotted at the inner margin or quite unicolorous - bebra Rothsch. male The black colour at the apex of the forewing does not nearly reach the cell and is deeply incised or spotted with the ground-colour, especially in cellules 4 and 5. Cameroons, Congo region, German East Africa. Similar to Charaxes paphianus but forewing apex not attenuated.

== Biology ==
The habitat consists of forests and woodland savanna.

The larvae feed on Acacia pennata and Acacia brevispica.

Notes on the biology of pleione are given by Kielland (1990) Larsen (1991) and Larsen (2005).

== Subspecies ==
- C. p. pleione — Guinea, Sierra Leone, Liberia, Ivory Coast, Ghana, Nigeria
- C. p. bebra Rothschild, 1900 — north-eastern Democratic Republic of the Congo, Uganda, south-western Kenya, north-western Tanzania
- C. p. congoensis Plantrou, 1989 — south-eastern Nigeria, Cameroon, Gabon, Congo, Central African Republic, Angola, Democratic Republic of the Congo
- C. p. delvauxi Turlin, 1987 — south-western Rwanda
- C. p. oriens Plantrou, 1989 — coast of Kenya, eastern Tanzania

Torben Larsen developed a species numbering system for his 2005 publication Butterflies of West Africa. The nominate subspecies is #772. The 'Larsen' numbers have since been used with permission in A Sharp Eye on Butterflies of Ghana.

== Taxonomy ==
Charaxes pleione is a member of the species group Charaxes paphianus. The supposed clade members are:

- Charaxes paphianus - nominate
- Charaxes pleione

== Realm ==
Afrotropical realm
