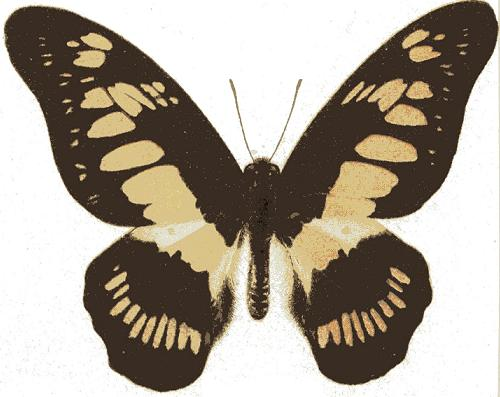

Scientific classification
- Kingdom: Animalia
- Phylum: Arthropoda
- Clade: Pancrustacea
- Class: Insecta
- Order: Lepidoptera
- Family: Papilionidae
- Genus: Graphium
- Species: G. latreillianus

Binomial name
- Graphium latreillianus (Godart, 1819)

Synonyms
- Papilio latreillianus Godart, 1819; Graphium (Arisbe) latreillianus; Papilio latreillanus var. theorini Aurivillius, 1881; Papilio potamonianus Ehrmann, 1909; Papilio latreillianus theorini ab. infrapicta Strand, 1914; Papilio aurivillianus Avinoff, 1926; Graphium tynderaeus theorini f. xerophila Berger, 1950; Papilio latreillanus theorini ab. lutea Birket-Smith, 1960

= Graphium latreillianus =

Species of butterfly

Graphium latreillianus, the coppery swordtail, is a butterfly in the family Papilionidae. It is found in Guinea, Sierra Leone, Liberia, Ivory Coast, Ghana, Nigeria, Cameroon, Sao Tome and Principe, Equatorial Guinea, Gabon, the Republic of the Congo, Angola, the Central African Republic, the Democratic Republic of the Congo, Chad, Uganda and Tanzania.

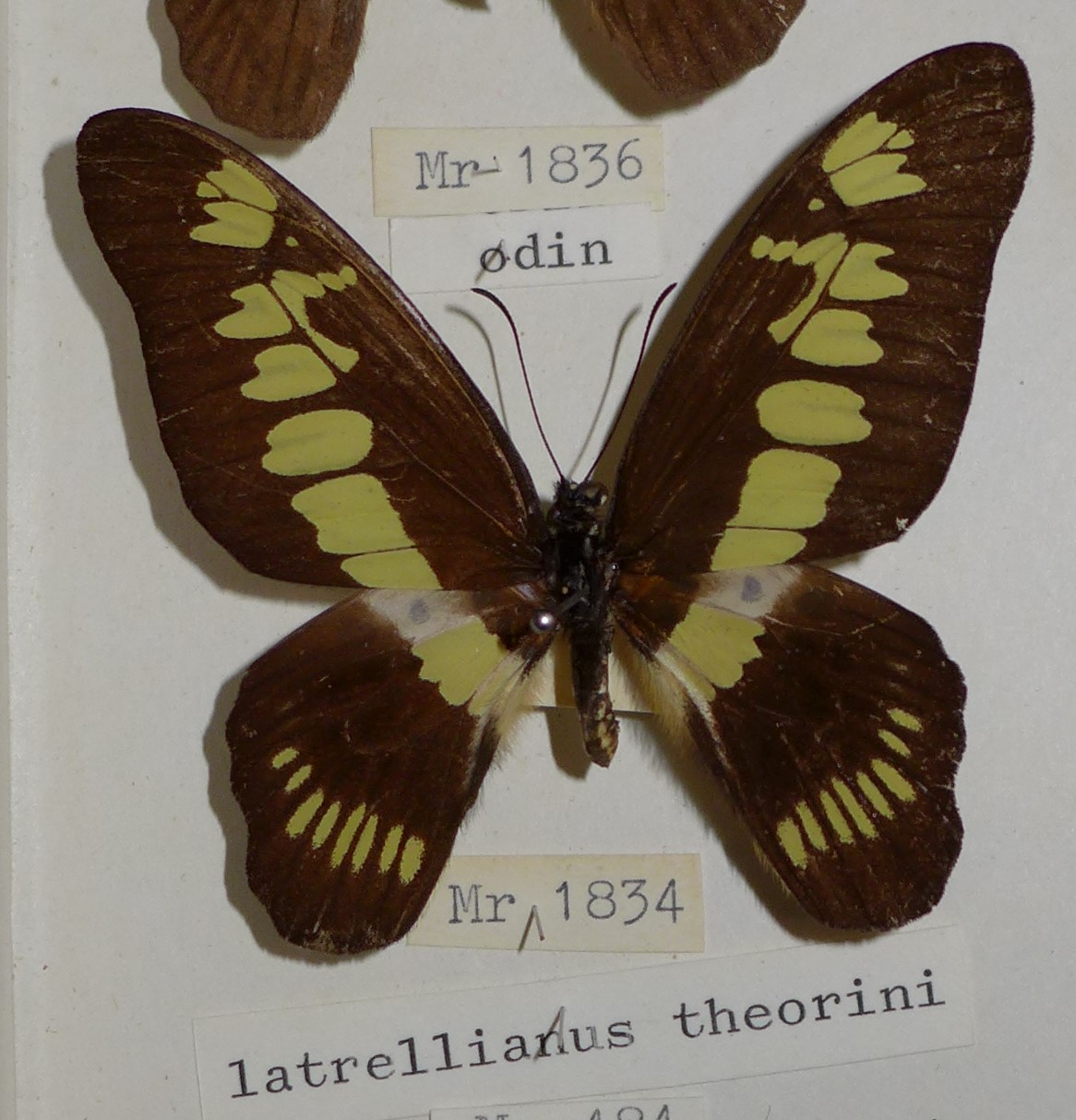
Graphium latreillianus theorini (Aurivillius, 1881)

== Description ==
For terms see External morphology of Lepidoptera

Hindwing tailless, with rounded margin, which is angled at the ends of the veins or merely undulate. Wings above black-brown with green spots. Hindwing beneath at the base with one or several separated black dots or spots and distinct black dots or spots in the apex of the cell and in the basal part of cellules 1 c—7. Margin of the hindwing slightly waved; palpi yellow; dots on frons and breast white, the spots of the under surface faint and yellowish, with a brassy sheen, never green. — latreillianus Godt. is smaller; forewing above with distinct green submarginal dots. Sierra Leone. — theorini Auriv. (3 d). Larger; the forewing entirely without submarginal dots. Cameroons to Angola

== Subspecies ==
- Graphium latreillianus latreillianus (Guinea, Sierra Leone, Liberia, Ivory Coast, Ghana)
- Graphium latreillianus theorini (Aurivillius, 1881) (Nigeria, Cameroon, Sao Tome and Principe, Equatorial Guinea, Gabon, Congo, Democratic Republic of the Congo, Angola, Central African Republic, Chad, western Uganda, Tanzania)

Torben Larsen developed a species numbering system for his 2005 publication Butterflies of West Africa. The nominate subspecies is #23. The 'Larsen' numbers have since been used with permission in A Sharp Eye on Butterflies of Ghana.

== Taxonomy ==
It is a member of the tynderaeus -clade (Graphium tynderaeus, Graphium philonoe, Graphium latreillianus).

== Images ==
External images from Royal Museum of Central Africa.
