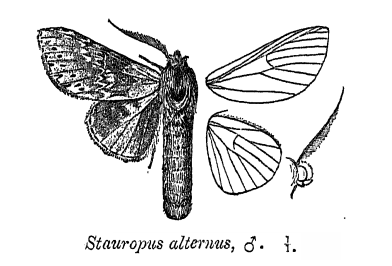

Scientific classification
- Kingdom: Animalia
- Phylum: Arthropoda
- Class: Insecta
- Order: Lepidoptera
- Superfamily: Noctuoidea
- Family: Notodontidae
- Genus: Stauropus
- Species: S. alternus

Binomial name
- Stauropus alternus (Walker, 1855)

Synonyms
- Neostauropus alternus

= Stauropus alternus =

Lobster caterpillar

Species of moth

Stauropus alternus, the lobster caterpillar, lobster moth or crab caterpillar, is a moth of the family Notodontidae. It is found in the north-eastern Himalaya, Sri Lanka, Sundaland, the Philippines, Sulawesi and the southern Moluccas. It was described by Francis Walker in 1855.

== Taxonomy ==
The species was separated in the genus Neostauropus by Sergius G. Kiriakoff but there are few differences and most authors treat it as a single genus Stauropus.

== Description ==
In males, the head and thorax are brownish grey. Abdomen is greyish brown with the dorsal tufts on first six segments darker. Forewings are brownish grey with indistinct antemedial and postmedial pale waved lines. The submarginal series have rusty red spots with pale lunules inside them. Hindwings are whitish with the costal and inner areas are brownish. Both wings with a marginal series of pale and reddish-brown lunules. Ventral side is brown. The female is similar to the male but with uniformly brown hindwings. Larva dark reddish brown. A pale dorsal line can be seen. There are grey subdorsal streaks on the fourth and sixth somites. The terminal somite is swollen and carried over the back with two angular processes from the proximity. Anal prolegs are absent. Second and third leg pairs are long.

== Ecology ==
The caterpillars feed on Ricinus, Careya, Cajanus, Cassia, Ougeinia, Pithecellobium and Wagatea species. They are considered a pest on pulses, tea, coffee, rambutan and mango. The caterpillars have long legs and rear up when threatened and are sometimes called crab or lobster caterpillars.

== Subspecies ==
- S. alternus alternus
- S. alternus brunneus (Sumatra)
- S. alternus niasicus (Nias)
- S. alternus nephodes (Philippines)
- S. alternus melastomatis (Amboina)
