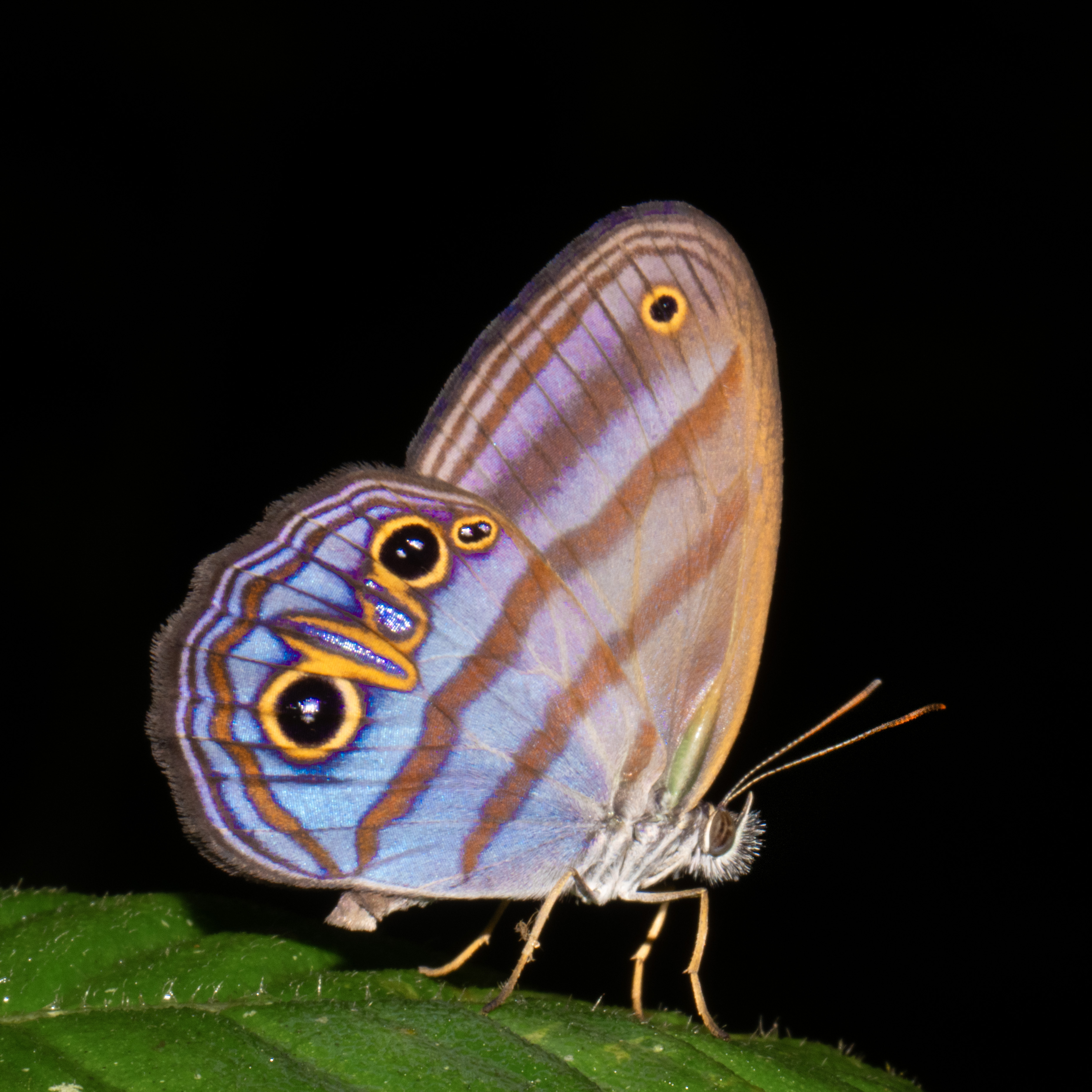

Scientific classification
- Kingdom: Animalia
- Phylum: Arthropoda
- Class: Insecta
- Order: Lepidoptera
- Family: Nymphalidae
- Genus: Chloreuptychia
- Species: C. chlorimene

Binomial name
- Chloreuptychia chlorimene (Hübner, [1819])

Synonyms
- Chloreuptychia chloris (Cramer, 1782)

= Chloreuptychia chlorimene =

Species of butterfly

Chloreuptychia chlorimene or Chloreuptychia chloris is a species of butterfly in the family Nymphalidae. It is found in northern South America (Ecuador, Suriname).

Two subspecies may be distinguished:

- Chloreuptychia chlorimene chlorimene Hübner, 1816
- Chloreuptychia chlorimene agathina (Weymer, 1911)
