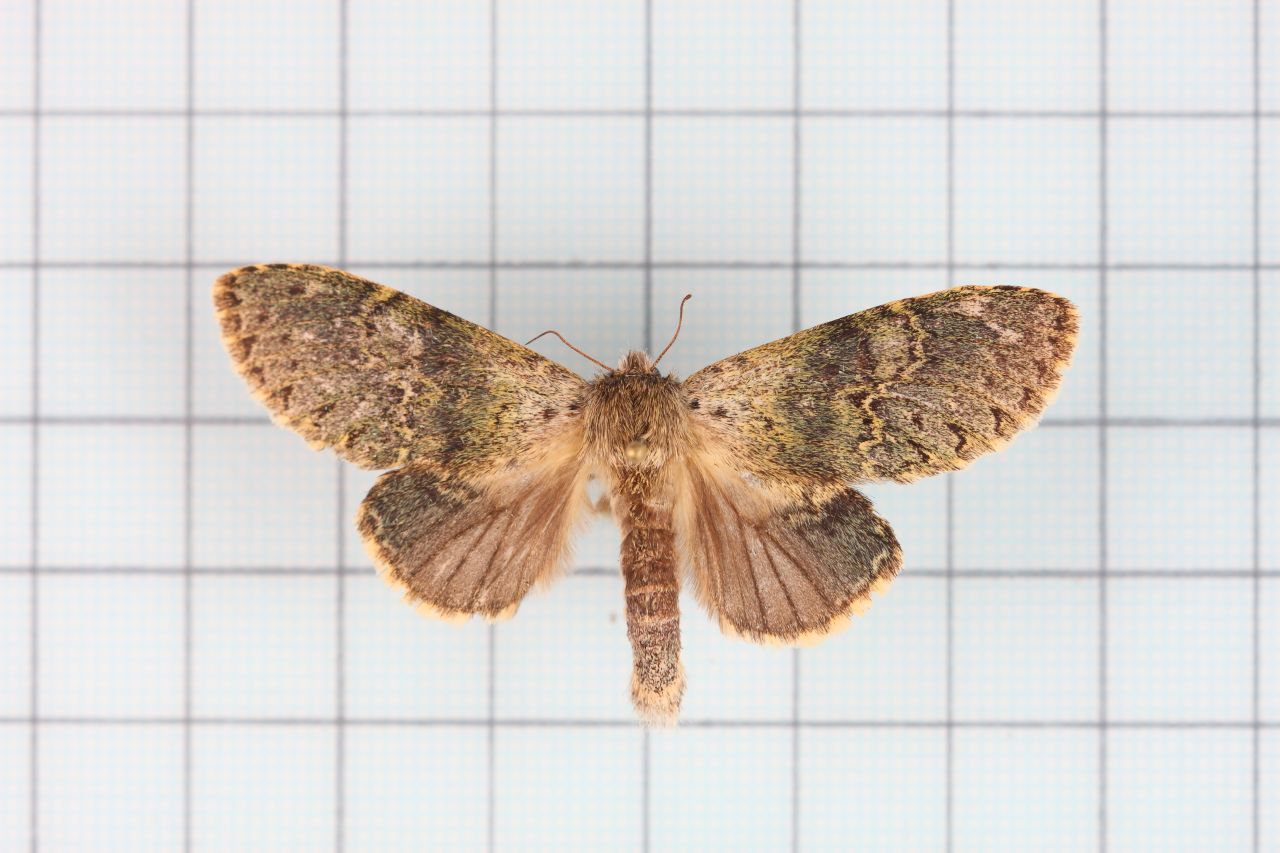
- Stauropus sikkimensis lushanus
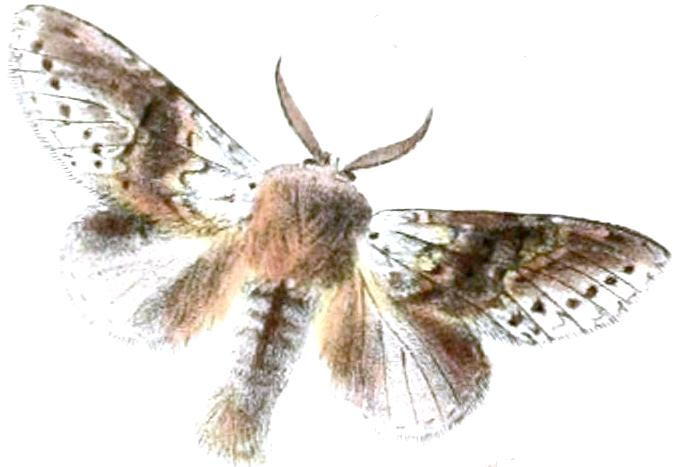
- Stauropus sikkimensis sikkimensis

Scientific classification
- Domain: Eukaryota
- Kingdom: Animalia
- Phylum: Arthropoda
- Class: Insecta
- Order: Lepidoptera
- Superfamily: Noctuoidea
- Family: Notodontidae
- Genus: Stauropus
- Species: S. sikkimensis

Binomial name
- Stauropus sikkimensis Moore, 1865

= Stauropus sikkimensis =

Species of moth

Stauropus sikkimensis is a moth of the family Notodontidae first described by Frederic Moore in 1865. It is found in Nepal, India, China and Taiwan.

== Subspecies ==
- Stauropus sikkimensis sikkimensis (Nepal, Himalaya: Sikkim)
- Stauropus sikkimensis khasianus Rothschild, 1917
- Stauropus sikkimensis lushanus Okano, 1960 (Taiwan)
- Stauropus sikkimensis erdmanni Schintlmeister, 1989 (China: Yunnan, Sichuan)
