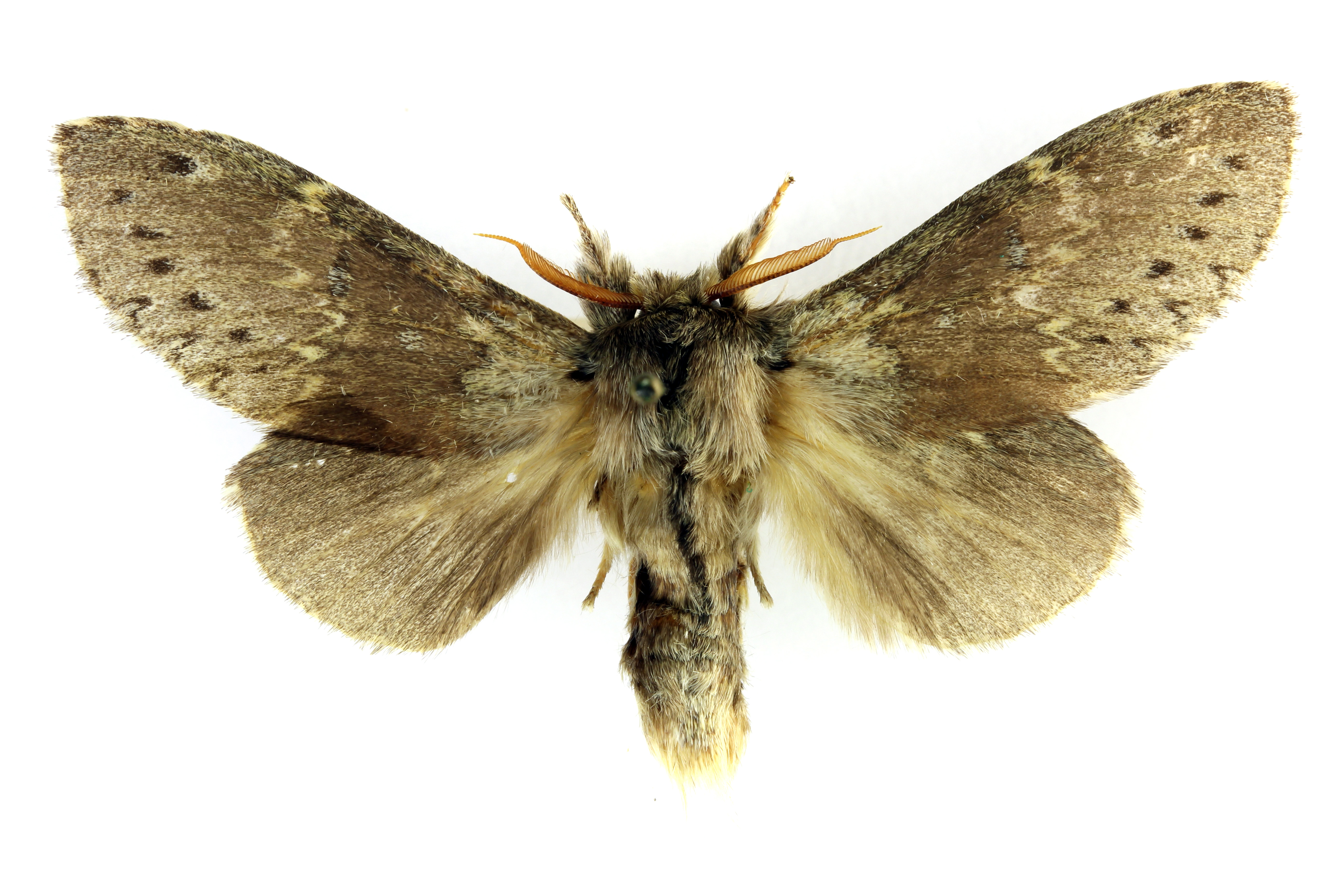
- Stauropus fagi

Scientific classification
- Domain: Eukaryota
- Kingdom: Animalia
- Phylum: Arthropoda
- Class: Insecta
- Order: Lepidoptera
- Superfamily: Noctuoidea
- Family: Notodontidae
- Genus: Stauropus; Germar, 1812

Synonyms
- Terasion Hübner, [1819]; Neostauropus Kiriakoff, 1967; Chlorostauropus Kiriakoff, 1968; Benbowia Kiriakoff, 1967; Miostauropus Kiriakoff, 1964

= Stauropus =

Genus of moths

Stauropus is a genus of moths of the family Notodontidae first described by Ernst Friedrich Germar in 1812.

== Species ==
- Subgenus Benbowia Kiriakoff, 1967
  - Stauropus callista (Schintlmeister, 1997)
  - Stauropus camilla (Schintlmeister, 1997)
  - Stauropus kiriakoff (Holloway, 1983)
  - Stauropus takamukuanus (Matsumura, 1925)
  - Stauropus virescens (Moore, 1879)
- Subgenus Chlorostauropus Kiriakoff, 1968
  - Stauropus alternus Walker, 1855
  - Stauropus viridissimus Bethune-Baker, 1904
- Subgenus Miostauropus Kiriakoff, 1964
  - Stauropus mioides (Hampson, 1904)
- Subgenus Palaeostauropus Okagaki & Nakamura, 1953
  - Stauropus obliterata Wileman & South, 1917
- Subgenus Stauropus
  - Stauropus abitus Kobayashi, M. Wang & Kishida, 2007
  - Stauropus basalis Moore, 1877
  - Stauropus berberisae Moore 1888
  - Stauropus fagi (Linnaeus, 1758)
  - Stauropus major van Eecke, 1929
  - Stauropus picteti Oberthür, 1911
  - Stauropus sikkimensis Moore, 1865
  - Stauropus skoui Schintlmeister, 2008
  - Stauropus teikichiana Matsumura, 1929
    - Stauropus teikichiana boreas Kobayashi & Kishida, 2007
    - Stauropus teikichiana fuscus Kobayashi & M. Wang, 2007
    - Stauropus teikichiana notus Kobayashi & Kishida, 2007
- Subgenus unknown
  - Stauropus basinigra (Moore, [1866])
