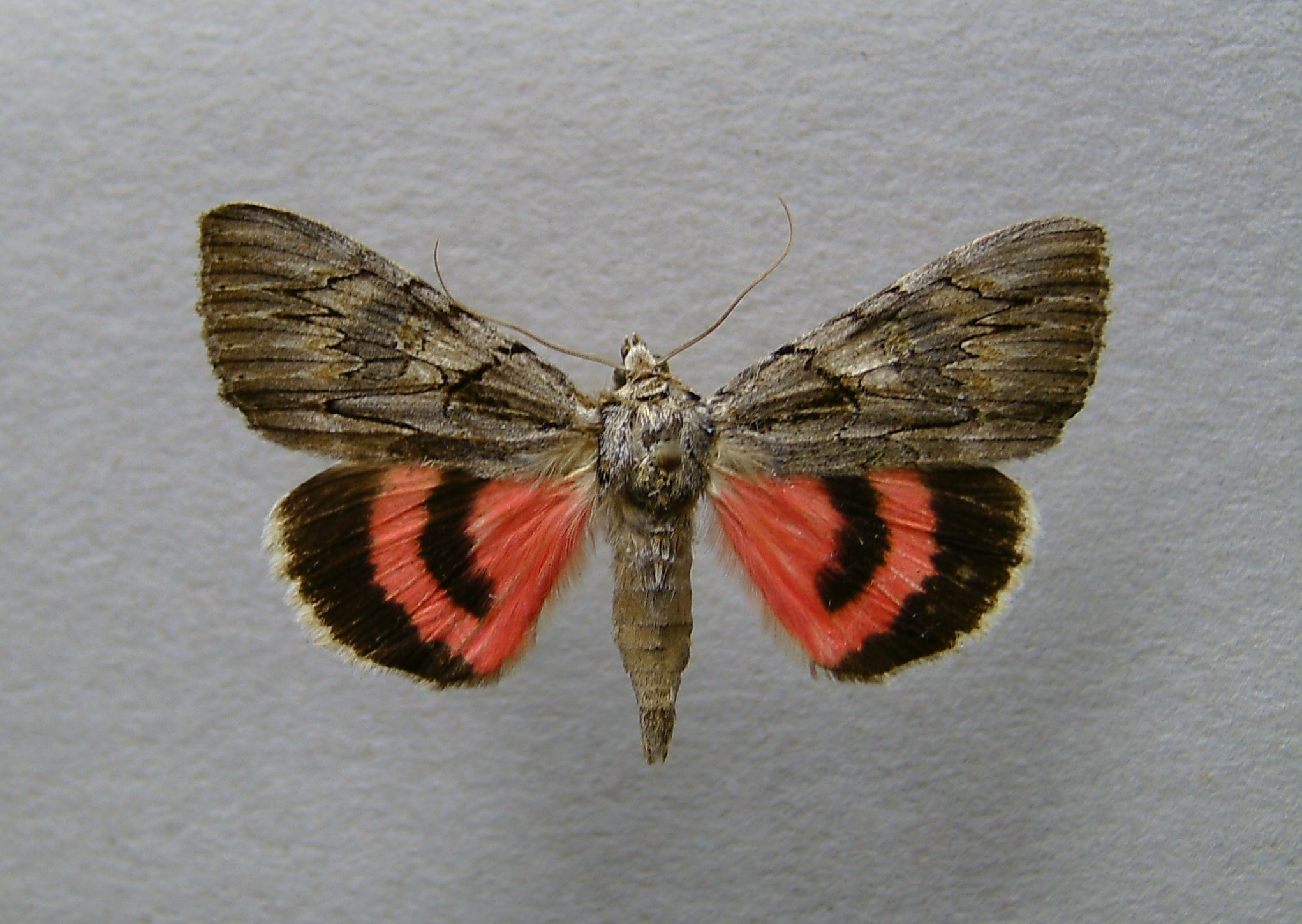

Scientific classification
- Kingdom: Animalia
- Phylum: Arthropoda
- Class: Insecta
- Order: Lepidoptera
- Superfamily: Noctuoidea
- Family: Erebidae
- Genus: Catocala
- Species: C. optata

Binomial name
- Catocala optata (Godart, 1824)

Synonyms
- Noctua optata Godart, 1824; Noctua optabilis Hübner, [1826]; Catocala optata var. amanda Boisduval, 1840; Catocala optata var. selecta Boisduval, 1840

= Catocala optata =

Species of moth

Catocala optata is a moth of the family Erebidae first described by Jean-Baptiste Godart in 1824. It is known from south-central Europe (except Greece) and north-western Africa.

The wingspan is 61–63 mm. Adults are on wing from July to September.

The larvae have been recorded feeding on Salix caprea and Salix viminalis. The larvae can be found from June to July.

== Subspecies ==
- Catocala optata optata
- Catocala optata atlantica Le Cerf, 1932 (Morocco)
