= Moullava digyna =

Scientific classification
- Kingdom: Plantae
- Clade: Tracheophytes
- Clade: Angiosperms
- Clade: Eudicots
- Clade: Rosids
- Order: Fabales
- Family: Fabaceae
- Subfamily: Caesalpinioideae
- Tribe: Caesalpinieae
- Genus: Moullava
- Species: M. digyna

Binomial name
- Moullava digyna (Rottler) E.Gagnon & G.P.Lewis

Synonyms
- Caesalpinia digyna Rottler

Species of legume

Moullava digyna, sometimes called the "teri pod", is a plant species in the tribe Caesalpinieae (it is often known under its synonym in genus Caesalpinia). This species is distributed from: India, Sri Lanka, Assam, Bengal, southern China, Indochina and Malesia. Other vernacular names include: Su-let-thi (Burmese).

== Description ==
A large, sparingly prickly, scandant shrub. Branches are glabrous or slightly downy, pinnae 5–9 pair. Leaflets obtuse, pale beneath, 8–10 pairs, 6–12 mm long. Flowers in simple axillary racemes, 25–30 cm long, pedicels slender 25 mm.long, petals orbicular, yellow, the upper streaked with red, filaments densely wooly in the lower half. Pod oblong, turgid, 30–50 mm long, seeds 2–4.
