= Pachliopta liris =

Scientific classification
- Kingdom: Animalia
- Phylum: Arthropoda
- Clade: Pancrustacea
- Class: Insecta
- Order: Lepidoptera
- Family: Papilionidae
- Genus: Pachliopta
- Species: P. liris

Binomial name
- Pachliopta liris (Godart, 1819)

Synonyms
- Papilio liris Godart, 1819; Papilio liris Rothschild, 1895; Atrophaneura liris (Godart, 1819); Pachlioptera liris; Papilio aberrans Butler, 1883

Species of butterfly

Pachliopta liris is a species of butterfly from the family Papilionidae that is found on Timor, Wetar, and Savu

The wingspan is 100–110 mm. The wings are dark-brown with red spots and white bands. The red spots are absent in females. The females are darker than the males.

== Subspecies ==
- Pachliopta liris aberrans (Butler, 1883) (Timor)
- Pachliopta liris gaetus Fruhstorfer (Savu Islands)
- Pachliopta liris liris (Godart, 1819) (Timor)
- Pachliopta liris pallidus (Rothschild, 1895) (Leti Islands)
- Pachliopta liris senescens (Röber, 1891) (Kisser)
- Pachliopta liris seruaensis (Arima & Morimoto, 1991) (Serua Island)
- Pachliopta liris wetterensis (Rothschild, 1895) (Wetar)
