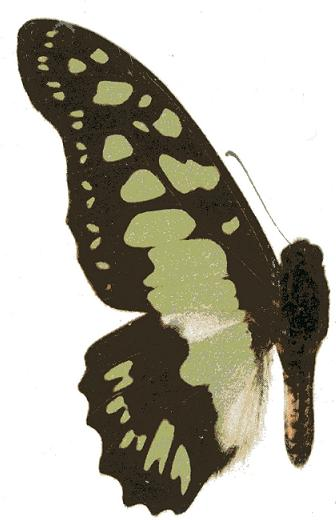
- Upperside
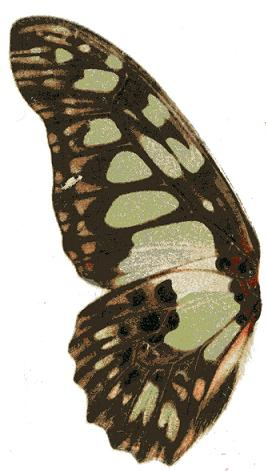
- Underside

Scientific classification
- Kingdom: Animalia
- Phylum: Arthropoda
- Clade: Pancrustacea
- Class: Insecta
- Order: Lepidoptera
- Family: Papilionidae
- Genus: Graphium
- Species: G. tynderaeus

Binomial name
- Graphium tynderaeus (Fabricius, 1793)

Synonyms
- Papilio tynderaeus Fabricius, 1793; Graphium (Arisbe) tynderaeus; Papilio nausinous Godart, 1819; Papilio tynderaeus var. ochrea Capronnier, 1889; Papilio tynderaeus ab. fraudatus Gaede, 1916; Papilio tynderaeus ab. incompleta Dufrane, 1936; Graphium tynderaeus ab. confluens Berger, 1950

= Graphium tynderaeus =

Species of butterfly

Graphium tynderaeus, the electric green swordtail, is a butterfly in the family Papilionidae. It is found in Guinea, Sierra Leone, Liberia, Ivory Coast, Ghana, Nigeria, Cameroon, Equatorial Guinea, Gabon, the Republic of the Congo, Angola, the Central African Republic, the Democratic Republic of the Congo and western Tanzania.

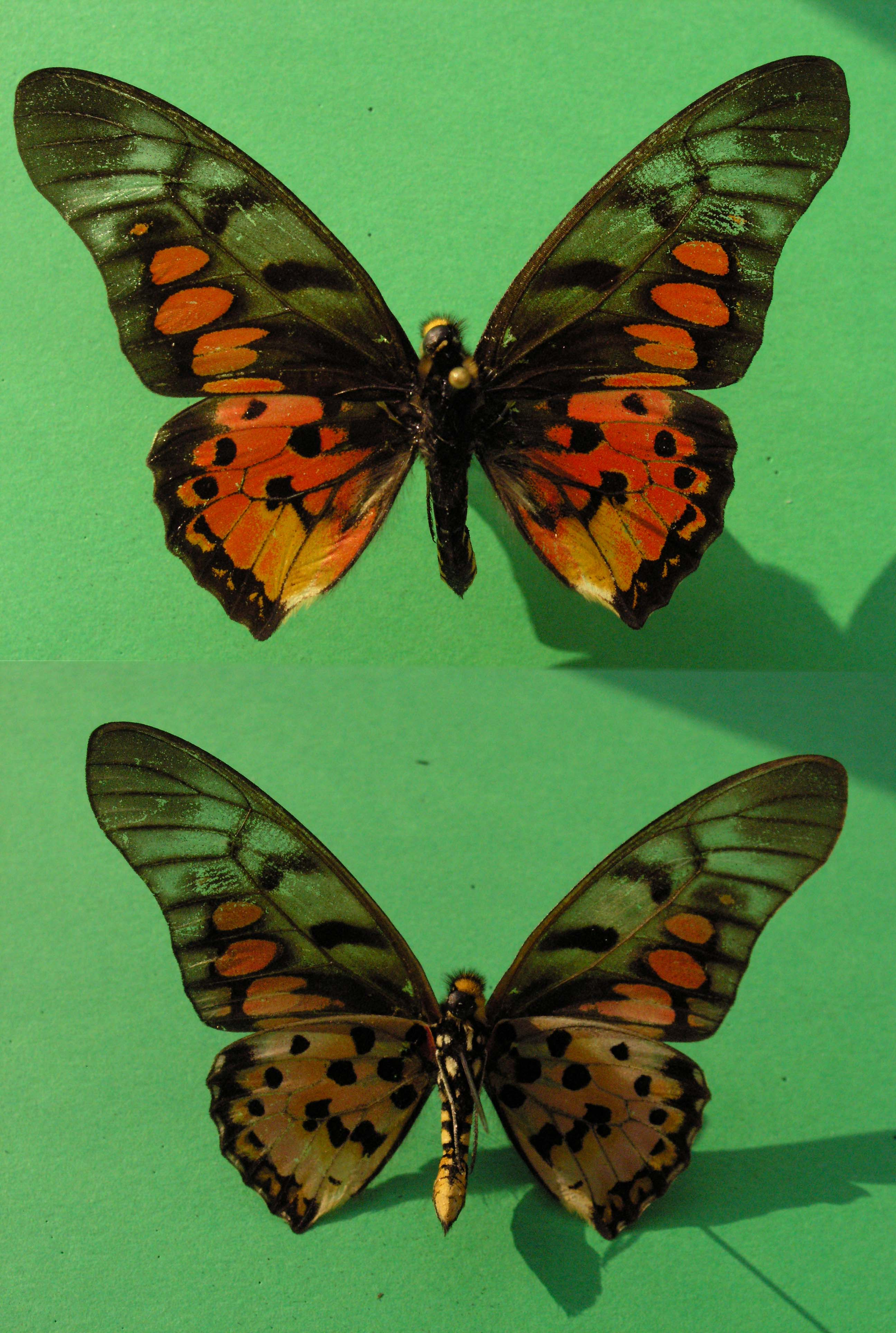

== Description ==
Hindwing tailless, with rounded margin, which is angled at the ends of the veins or merely undulate. Wings above black-brown with green spots. Hindwing beneath at the base with one or several separated black dots or spots and distinct black dots or spots in the apex of the cell and in the basal part of cellules 1 c—7. Forewing beneath not red at the base, with two submarginal spots in each cellule; the median band of the hindwing consists of a green spot in the cell and in 1 c, as well as a whitish spot in cellule 7; all the spots of the upper surface and also the discal spots of the under surface are vivid green, only becoming yellowish through discoloration (ab. ochrea Capr.); the palpi and the dots on frons and breast are red; the wings beneath with more or less purple sheen. — West African primeval forest region, from Sierra Leone to the Upper Congo.

Torben Larsen developed a species numbering system for his 2005 publication Butterflies of West Africa. This species is #22. The 'Larsen' numbers have since been used with permission in A Sharp Eye on Butterflies of Ghana.

== Biology ==
Its habitat consists of primary lowland forests.

Males may mud-puddle but are extremely wary if approached.

== Taxonomy ==
It is a member of the tynderaeus -clade (Graphium tynderaeus, Graphium philonoe, Graphium latreillianus).

== Images ==
External images from Royal Museum of Central Africa.
