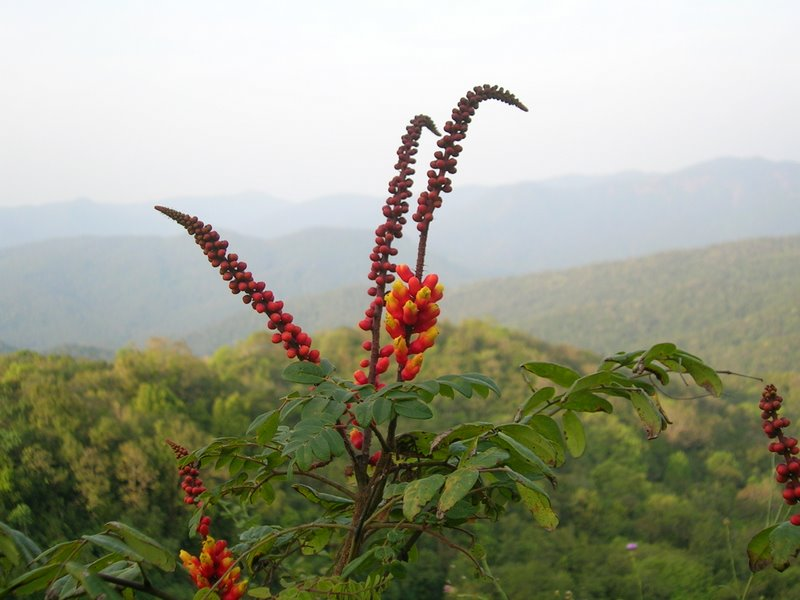

Scientific classification
- Kingdom: Plantae
- Clade: Tracheophytes
- Clade: Angiosperms
- Clade: Eudicots
- Clade: Rosids
- Order: Fabales
- Family: Fabaceae
- Subfamily: Caesalpinioideae
- Genus: Moullava
- Species: M. spicata

Binomial name
- Moullava spicata (Dalzell) Nicolson

Synonyms
- Wagatea spicata Dalzell

= Moullava spicata =

Species of legume

Moullava spicata is an endemic species of creeper found in the Western Ghats of India.

== Description ==
As follows:

- It is a robust woody climber, having recurved prickles on its branches.
- Leaves - compound, bipinnate, 23–30 cm long with 4 to 6 pairs of pinnae, each 7.5 to 12 cm long, and having 5 to 7 pairs of oblong, coriaceous and dark-green leaflets on each pinna. The main rachis is armed with prickles.
- Flowers - sessile in dense spicate racemes reaching 60 cm long; the rachis is grooved with soft hairs, armed with prickles.
- Corolla - has 5 petals, inserted on top of the calyx-tube, obovate-spathulate, dark orange. 1 cm long, doesn't open fully.
- Calyx : scarlet,
- Androecium : has 10 stamens.
- Fruit - a linear oblong pod, swollen above the seeds and constricted between them.
- Seeds - 3 to 4, oblong, hard, bony.
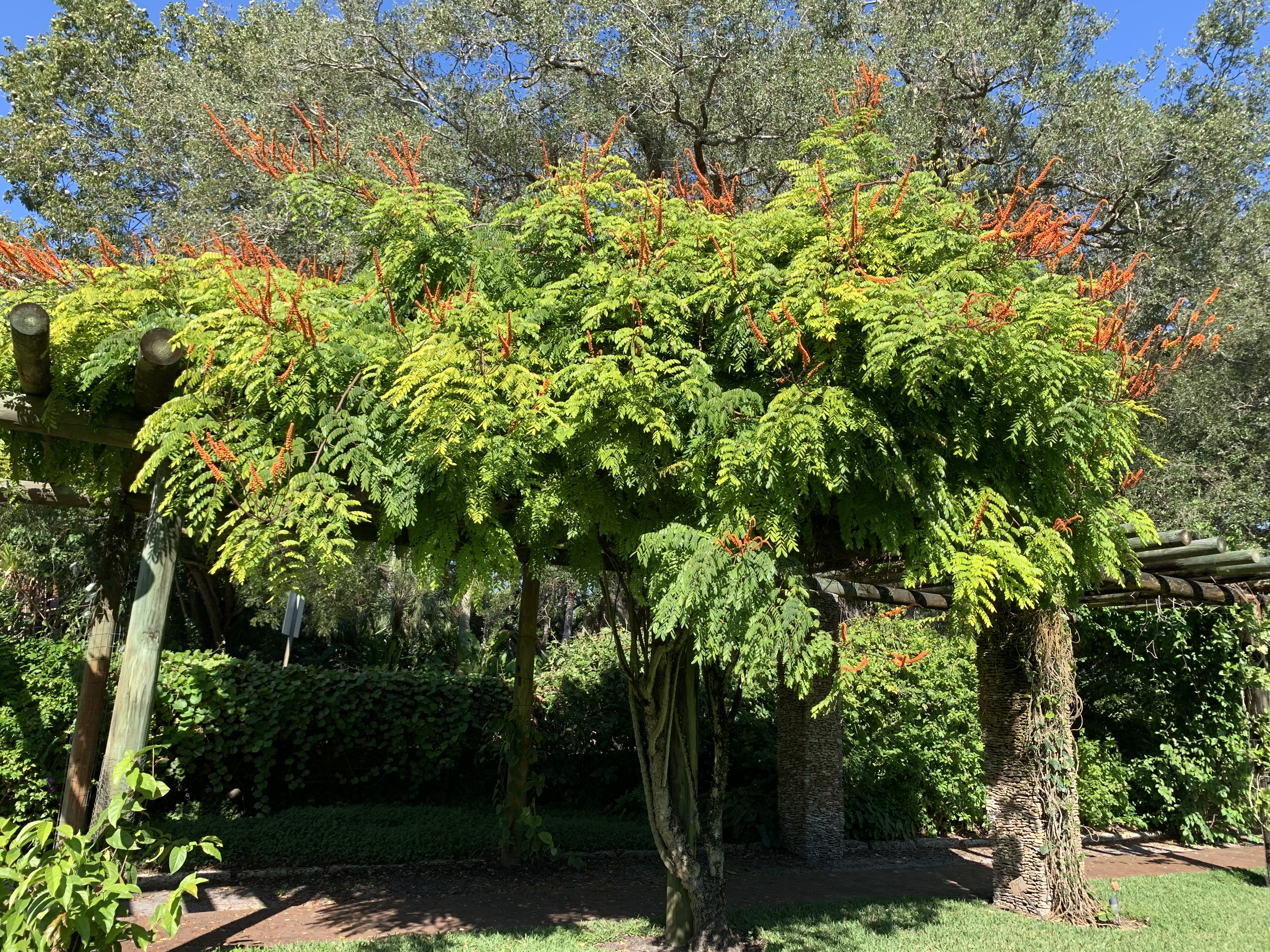
Habit

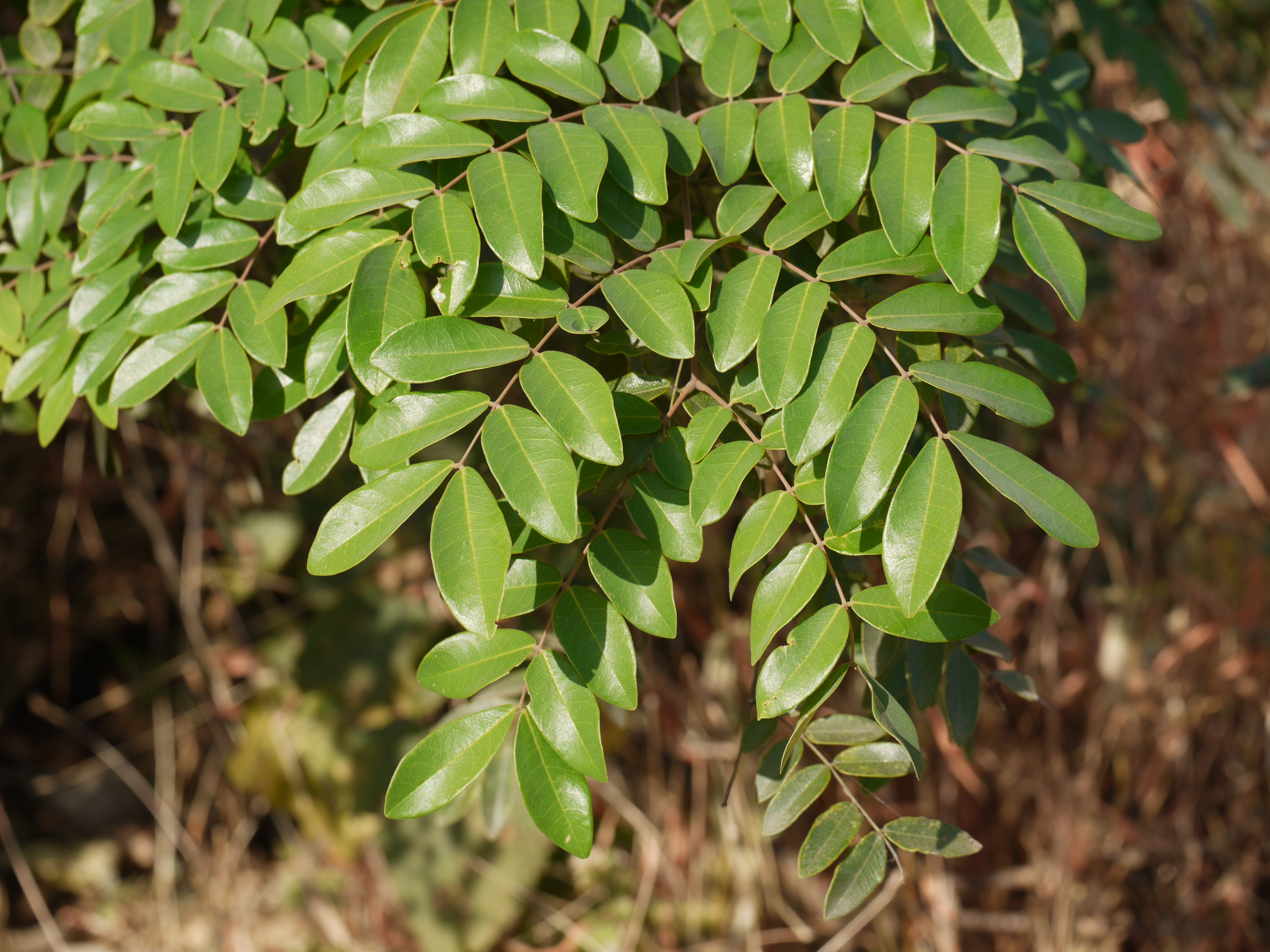
Bipinnate leaves

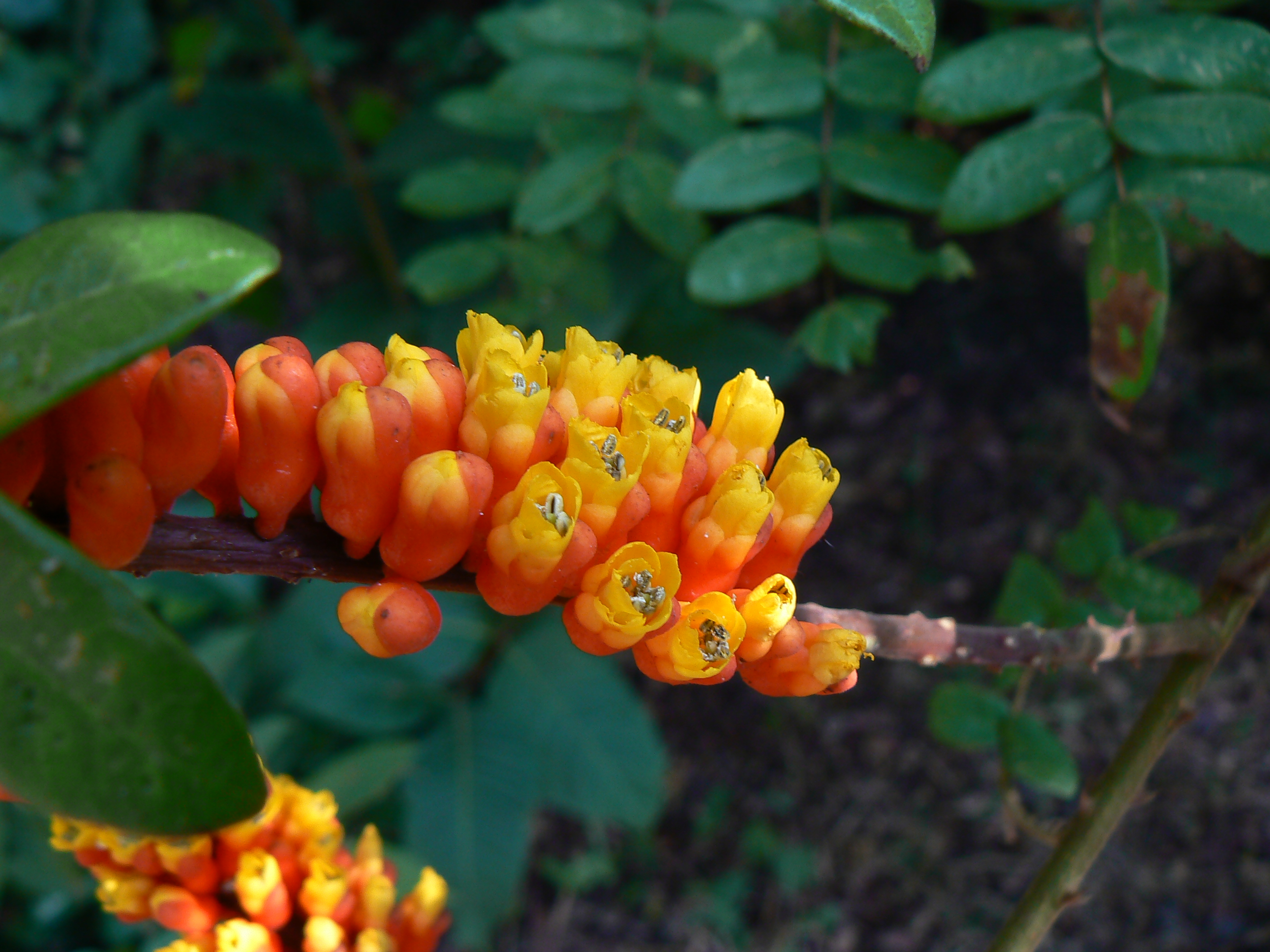
Inflorescence

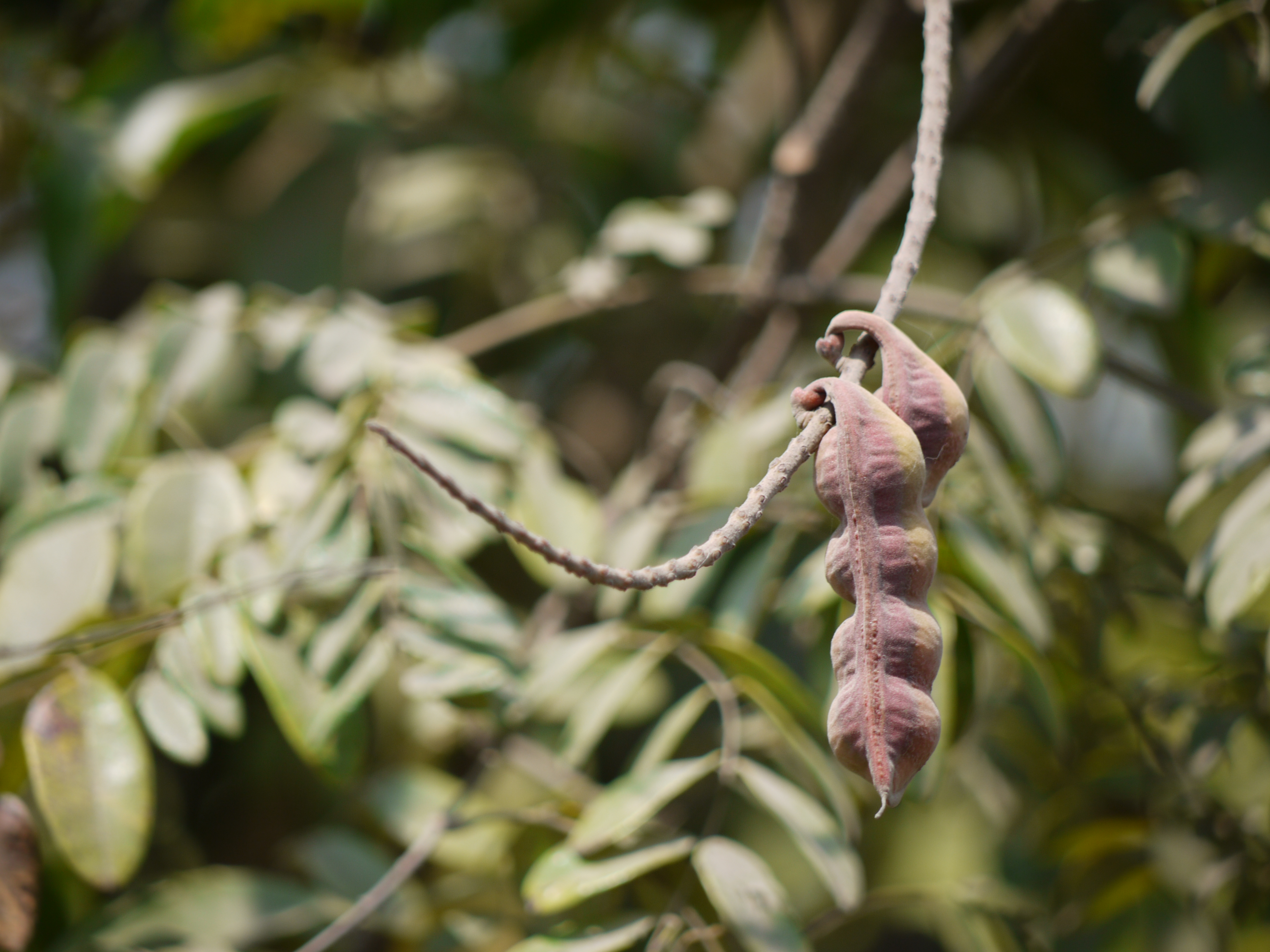
Fruit

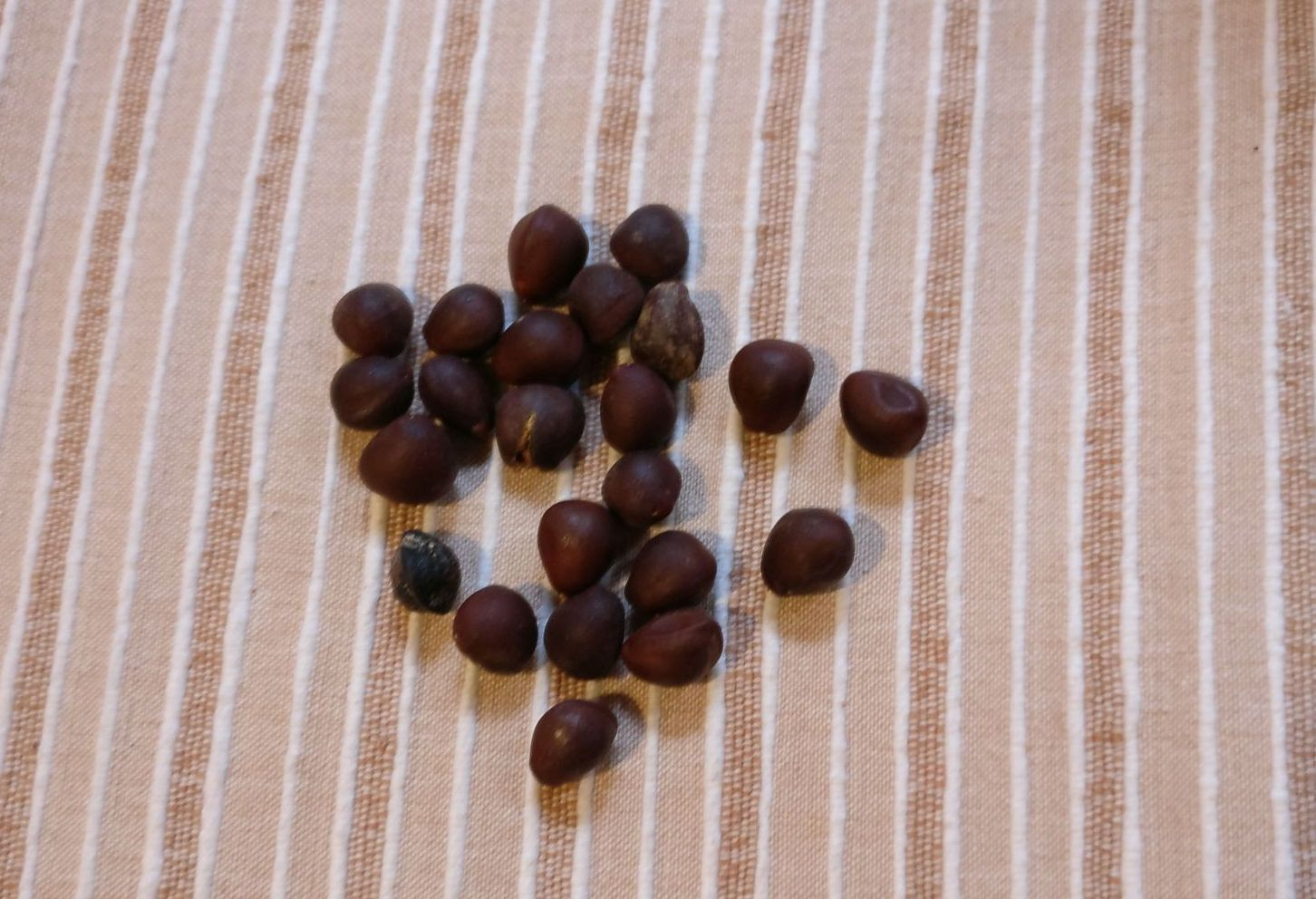
Seeds

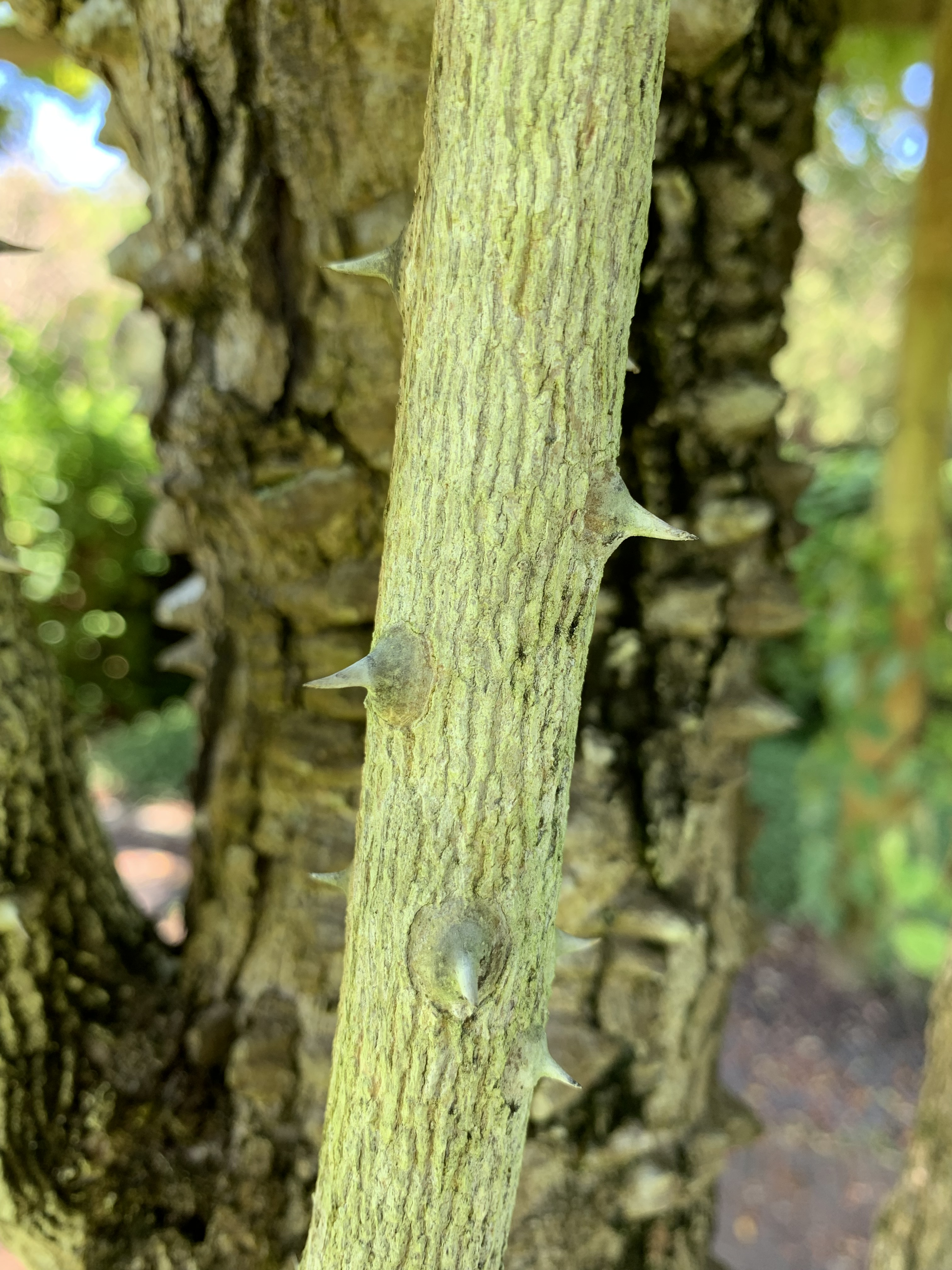
Recurved prickles

== Natural history ==
Moullava spicata is a creeper endemic to the moist deciduous and semievergreen forests of the Western Ghats. The creeper flowers and fruits from October to May. The flowers are frequented by birds and insects.

== Uses ==
The seed of M. spicata yields an oil used for burning in lamps.

== Local names ==
Local names in the different ranges of the Western Ghats are:

- English: Candy Corn plant
- Marathi: Wagati वागाटी, Wakeri वाकेरी
- Tamil: Okkadikkodi, Pulinakkagondai
- Kannada: ಗಜ್ಜಿಗಾಬಲ್ಲೀ Gajjigaballi
