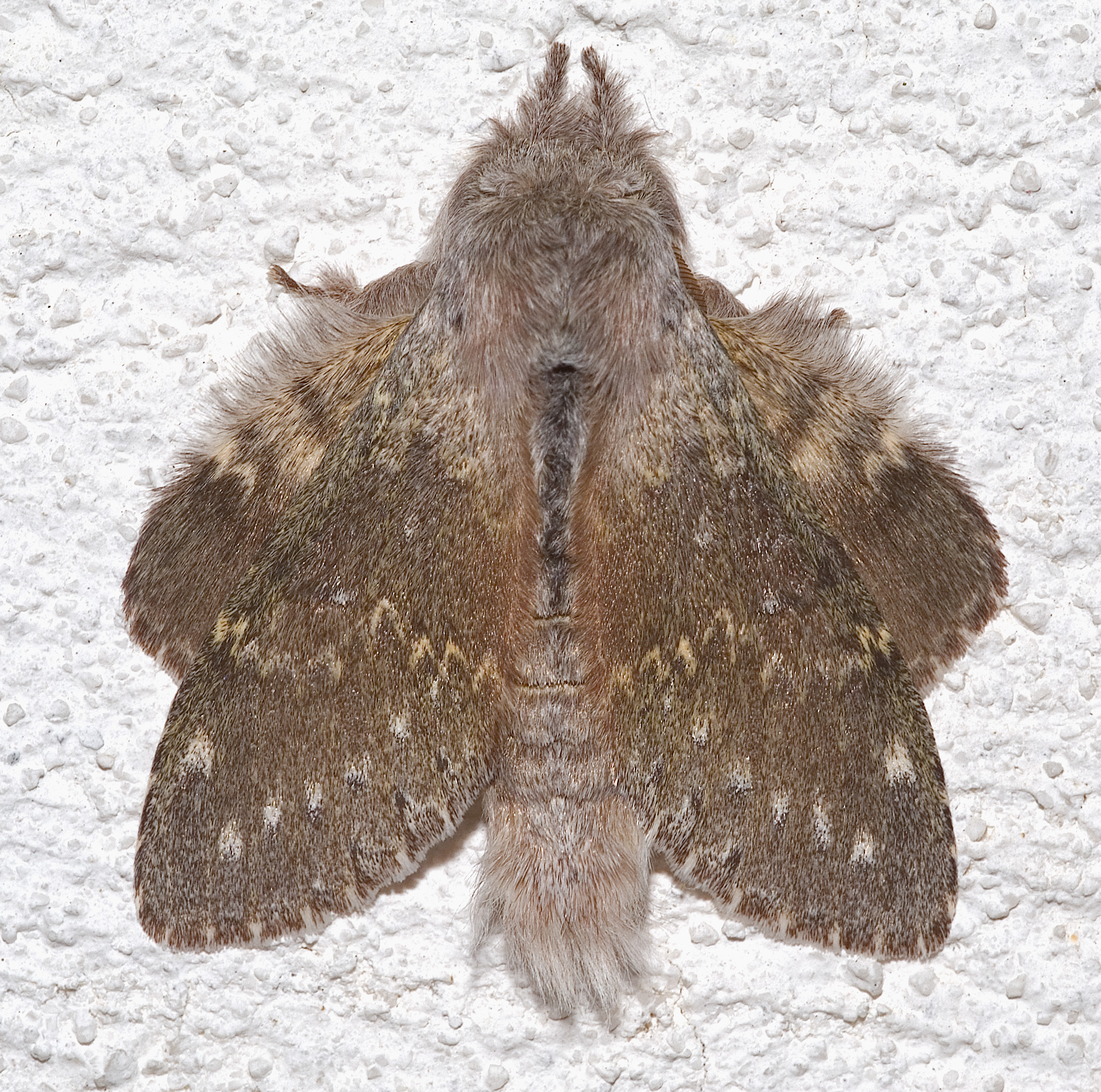
- At rest the wings are positioned with the costa and apex of the hindwings protruding from behind the forewings.
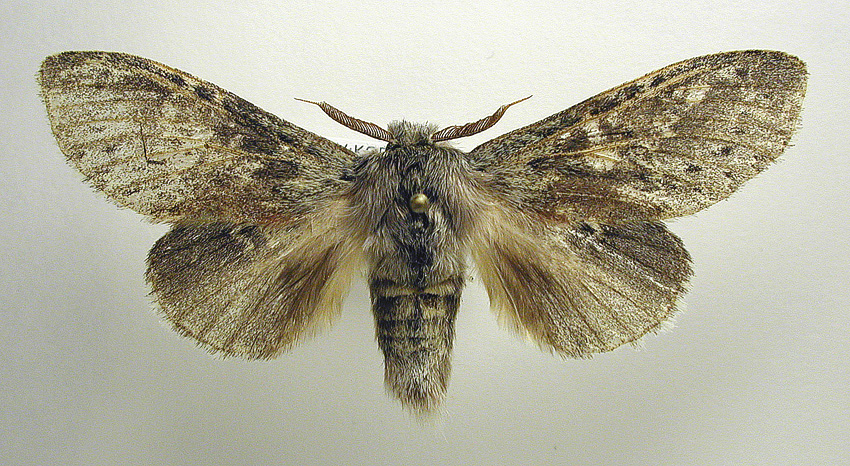
- Museum specimen

Conservation status
- Least Concern (IUCN 3.1)

Scientific classification
- Kingdom: Animalia
- Phylum: Arthropoda
- Clade: Pancrustacea
- Class: Insecta
- Order: Lepidoptera
- Superfamily: Noctuoidea
- Family: Notodontidae
- Genus: Stauropus
- Species: S. fagi

Binomial name
- Stauropus fagi (Linnaeus, 1758)

= Lobster moth =

Species of insect

The lobster moth (Stauropus fagi), also known as lobster prominent, is a moth from the family Notodontidae. The species was first described by Carl Linnaeus in his 10th edition of Systema Naturae. The English common name refers to the crustacean-like appearance of the caterpillar.

== Description ==
The moth has a wingspan ranging from 40 to 70 millimetres. The forewings are grey to grey-brown or green-brown, while the distal part has a slightly lighter colour. There are two bright, jagged crossbands, which are often only dimly visible on the front wings. Between these, the midfield of the wing is usually slightly darker. The hindwings are similar in colour but unmarked.

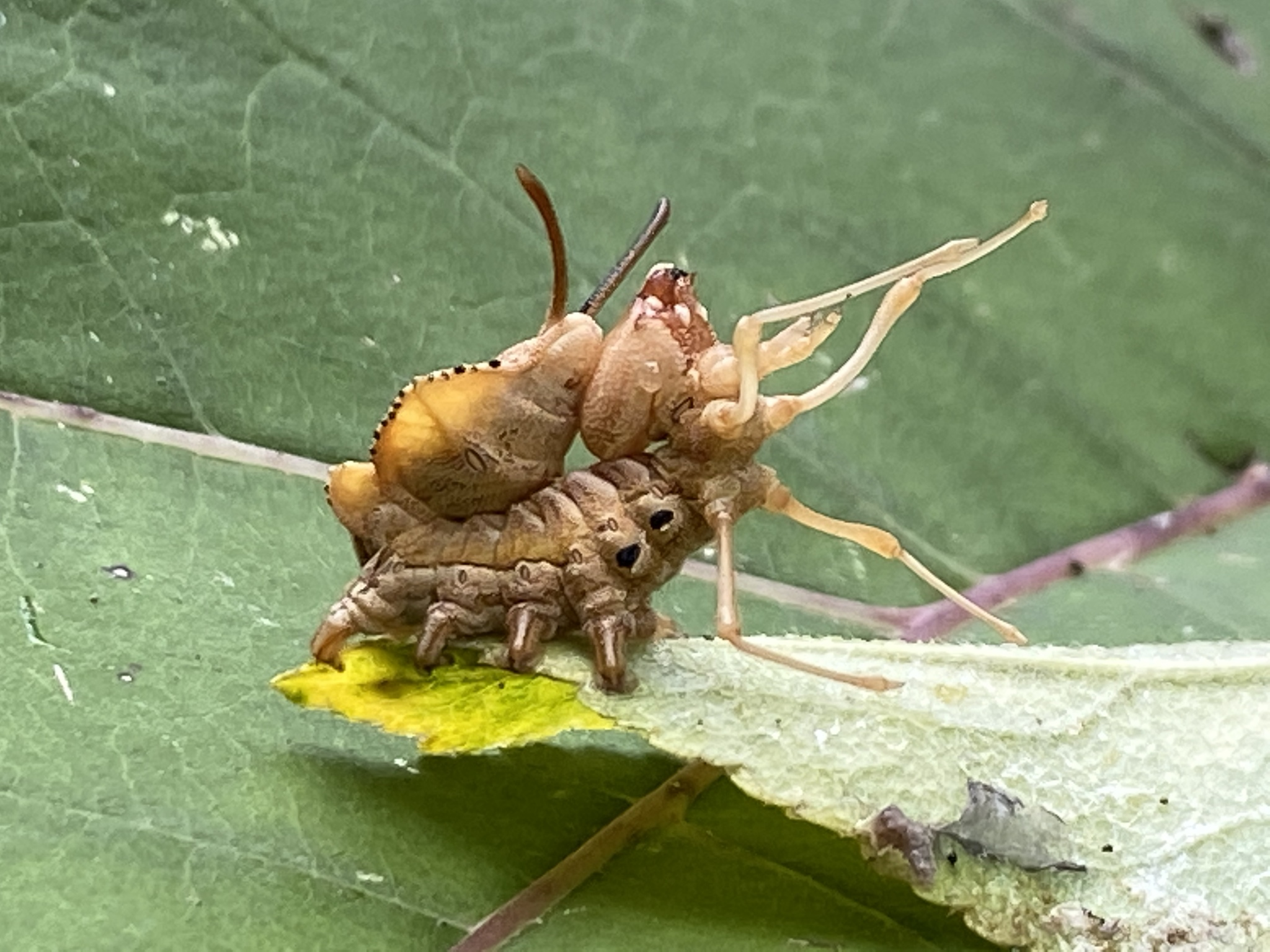
Caterpillar

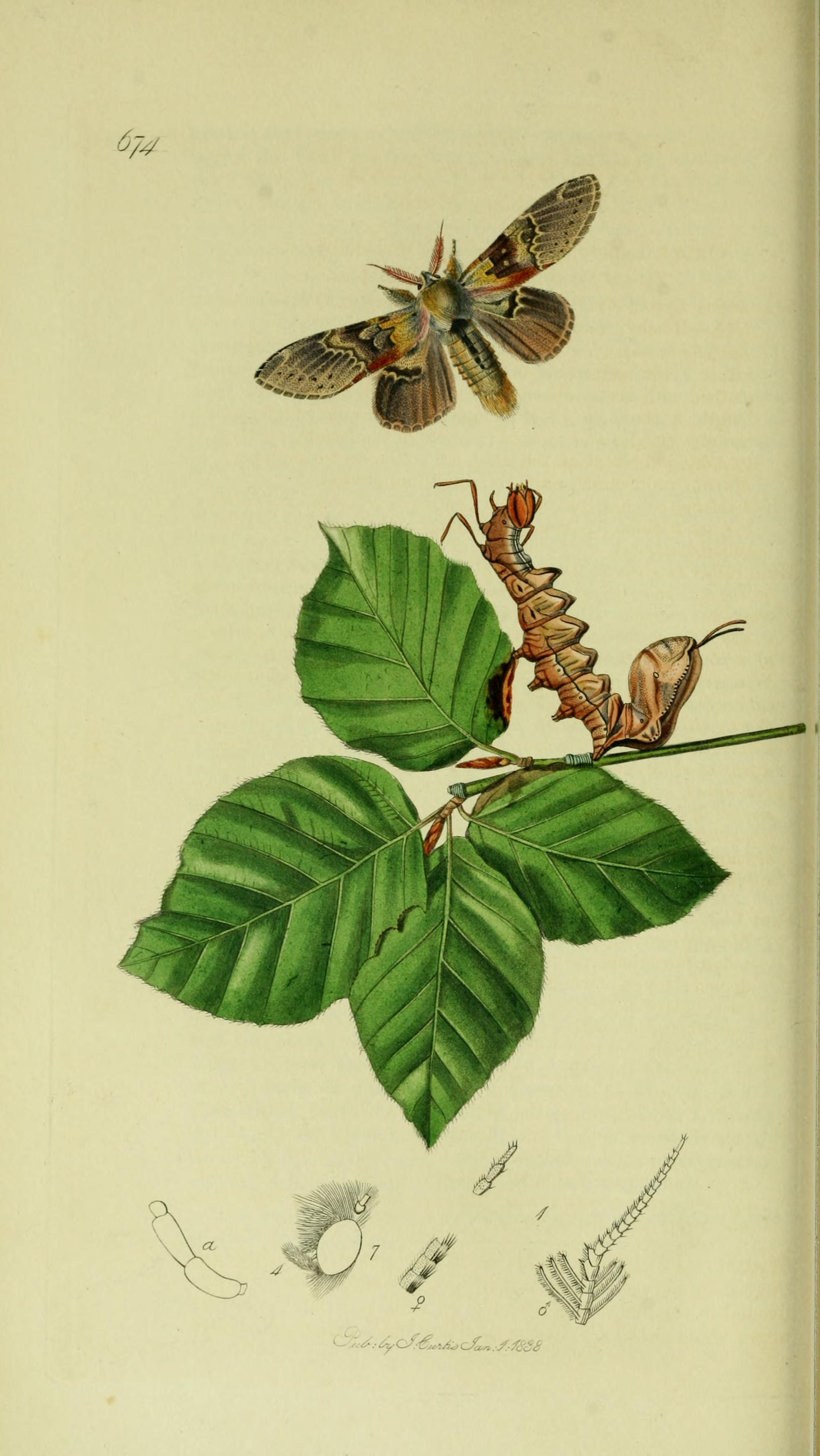
Illustration from John Curtis's British Entomology Volume 5

== Technical description ==
Wings grey-brown; forewing with light grey base and black basal dot, a pale dentate band at the border of the light basal area and another in the centre, before the margin a row of dark submarginal dots which are edged with white proximally; hind margin usually red-brown. Hindwing with some light spots in the centre of the costal margin. Antennae red-brown, head and thorax grey-brown to mouse-grey, abdomen lighter. Underside of forewing light grey-brown, of hindwing and abdomen light greyish yellow. Throughout Europe with the exception of the most southern districts, occurring as far as Portugal, Central Italy and Bulgaria, and northward to Sweden and Livonia; Russia (Ural), Armenia, Amurland, Japan. Together with the typical form occurs in Europe a form with the forewing darkened and sharply marked; this is ab. obscura Rebel [ab. obscuraRebel, 1910]. The Japanese form, persimilis Butl. (44 g) (Note: “44 g” is a page signature used in Seitz’s Macrolepidoptera of the World (1906). Seitz’s volumes divide pages into lettered sections (a, b, c … g), so “44 g” refers to the portion of page 44 labelled “g”.) [now subspecies S. fagi persimilis Butler, 1879], is somewhat smaller than true fagi, with more uniformly red-brown colouring and less obvious light basal area of the forewing. — Larva yellowish brown to dark brown, with black longitudinal lines on the 3 anterior pairs of tubercles, the lines of the second and third pairs being continued as oblique lateral stripes to the stigmata. On abdominal segments 1 and 2 a black spot below the stigmata, on 3 to 6 a narrow black lateral line situated just above the spiracles. June to autumn on Beech, Oak, Lime, Hazel, Walnut. In captivity it is necessary always to provide fresh food for the larvae and also to give them water to drink. The larvae are quarrelsome and mordaceous, and collectors have been warned not to keep a number together as they wound each other. This, though denied by some, has lately been proved to be true in the case of faulty treatment. It is very difficult to feed up larvae collected when very young, moulting being especially perilous for the larvae on account of their irregular shape. Pupa glossy black-brown, in a light pale grey cocoon which is placed between leaves. Early larvae give the moths already in June or August, while from those pupating at the end of July or later the moths appear in May or June of the following year. The moths come to the light; they rest in day-time closely appressed to tree trunks, the strongly woolly fore legs being held stretched forward as in Dasychira pudibunda Karl Grünberg.

== Distribution ==
The moth lives in the whole Palearctic realm except the north of Africa; absent in Siberia between Ob' river and Lake Baikal. In Britain it is more frequent in the southern counties

== Life history ==
In the first instar the caterpillar feeds entirely on its own egg-shell and is unusual in that it mimics an ant or small spider. This is due to the long thoracic legs "and caudal appendages which are ever nervously twisting about". If the larva is disturbed during this period it wriggles about violently in the same manner as an injured ant. "The young caterpillars keep guard over their own egg-shell. They keep nervously moving around and about this, and if perchance another caterpillar should approach within touch of it, a vigorous attack is made to drive off the intruder." After the first skin change the larvae feed on the leaves of Acer (Japan), Betula (British Isles, Finland, Japan), Carpinus (Japan), Castanea (Japan), Castanea crenata (Japan), Cornus (Japan), Corylus (British Isles, Japan), Corylus avellana (Finland), Fagus (British Isles) Juglans regia (Europe), Malus (Japan), Malus pumila (Finland), Prunus (Japan), Pterocarya (Japan), Quercus (British Isles, Japan), Quercus acutissima (Japan), Quercus mongolica (Japan), Quercus serrata (Japan), Salix (Japan), Salix caprea (Finland), Sorbus aucuparia (Finland), Tilia (Japan), Tilia cordata (Finland), Wisteria (Japan) Zelkova (Japan). During the following instars the caterpillar develops even more of an odd appearance with "a large head, (the) long thoracic legs, raised humps on the fourth to seventh segments and a greatly swollen anal segment that has the claspers modified into long thin structures". The general colour is reddish brown and if in its resting position provides perfect cryptic camouflage. The larvae can grow to a length of 70 mm and if disturbed by a potential predator can put on a menacing display with the thoracic legs splayed out and the head arched back over the body. The moth pupates in a strong cocoon, "usually spun up between dead leaves". The moths emerge the following year from May until July depending on conditions.
