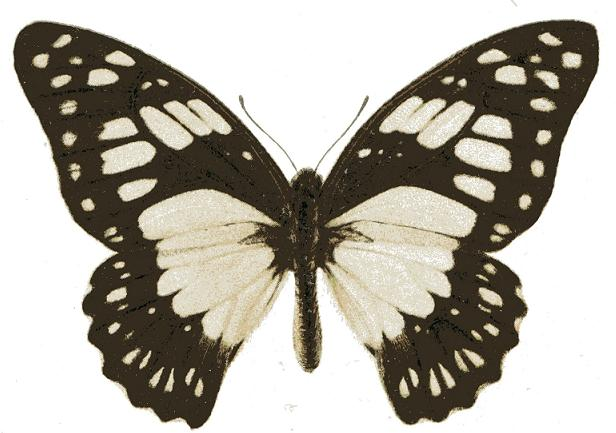
- Upperside
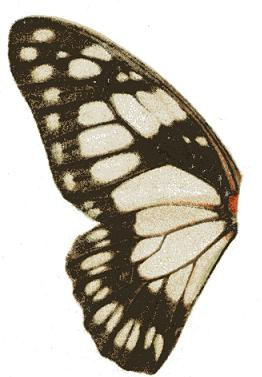
- Underside

Scientific classification
- Kingdom: Animalia
- Phylum: Arthropoda
- Clade: Pancrustacea
- Class: Insecta
- Order: Lepidoptera
- Family: Papilionidae
- Genus: Graphium
- Species: G. philonoe

Binomial name
- Graphium philonoe (Ward, 1873)

Synonyms
- Papilio philonoë Ward, 1873; Graphium (Arisbe) philonoe; Papilio philonoë f. dulcinea Stoneham, 1931; Papilio philonoe whalleyi Talbot, 1929

= Graphium philonoe =

Species of butterfly

Graphium philonoe, the eastern white-lady swordtail, is a butterfly in the family Papilionidae. It is found in Sudan, Ethiopia, Uganda, Kenya, the Democratic Republic of the Congo, Tanzania, Malawi and Mozambique. Its habitat consists of coastal and riparian forests.

== Description ==
For terms, see External morphology of Lepidoptera

Differs from [related species] in that the discal spots of cellules 1 a and 1 b of the forewing cover the base of these cellules; the submarginal spots of cellules 4—8 of the fore¬wing are single, rounded and rather large, those of the hindwing on the contrary represented in each cellule by two streaks; the basal spots of cellules 2, 3 and 6 of the hindwing are sharply defined distally, transversely cut off or rounded; the cell of the forewing before the middle with three white dots in a transverse line, then a large transverse spot divided into three parts by the dark folds and finally at the apex two white dots; the discal spots of cellules 2—4 of the forewing are usually rounded and more or less separated. — German and British East Africa.

== Biology ==
Males may infrequently mud-puddle. Both sexes are attracted to flowers, including Maerua species.

The larvae feed on Uvaria leptocladon, Uvaria chamae and Annona species.

== Subspecies ==
- Graphium philonoe philonoe (Democratic Republic of the Congo, coast of Kenya, eastern Tanzania, Malawi, Mozambique)
- Graphium philonoe whalleyi (Talbot, 1929) (southern Sudan, south-western Ethiopia, northern Uganda, north-western Kenya)

== Taxonomy ==
It is a member of the tynderaeus -clade (Graphium tynderaeus, Graphium philonoe, Graphium latreillianus).In some works it is seen as the sole member of species group philonoe.

== Images ==
External images from Royal Museum of Central Africa.
