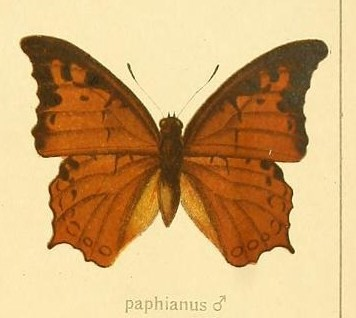

Scientific classification
- Kingdom: Animalia
- Phylum: Arthropoda
- Clade: Pancrustacea
- Class: Insecta
- Order: Lepidoptera
- Family: Nymphalidae
- Subfamily: Charaxinae
- Tribe: Charaxini
- Genus: Charaxes
- Species: C. paphianus

Binomial name
- Charaxes paphianus Ward, 1871

Synonyms
- Charaxes paphianus renati Rousseau-Decelle, 1938; Philognoma falcata Butler, 1872; Palla falcata f. hamulosa Weymer, 1892

= Charaxes paphianus =

Species of butterfly

Charaxes paphianus, the falcate red charaxes, is a butterfly in the family Nymphalidae. It is found in Sierra Leone, Guinea, Liberia, Ivory Coast, Ghana, Togo, Nigeria, Cameroon, Gabon, the Republic of the Congo, the Central African Republic, Angola, the Democratic Republic of the Congo, Uganda, Sudan and Kenya. The habitat consists of primary lowland evergreen forests.

The larvae feed on Acacia species, including A. brevispica.

== Short description ==
Forewing with concave edge and sharp point and reddish-brown-yellow ground colour. The termen black edged with a width of 2–4 mm black; two black costal marks and some black discal flecks. The cross line of the underside forewing bent. Underside paler with a cross line separating a paler inner area from a less pale outer area; almost everywhere with grey satin.

== Subspecies ==
- Charaxes paphianus paphianus (Nigeria, Cameroon, Gabon, Congo, Central African Republic, northern Angola, Democratic Republic of the Congo)
- Charaxes paphianus falcata (Butler, 1872) (Sierra Leone, Guinea, Liberia, Ivory Coast, Ghana, Togo, Nigeria, western Cameroon)
- Charaxes paphianus subpallida Joicey & Talbot, 1925 (north-eastern Democratic Republic of the Congo, southern Sudan, Uganda, western Kenya)

Torben Larsen developed a species numbering system for his 2005 publication Butterflies of West Africa. The subspecies falcata is #773. The 'Larsen' numbers have since been used with permission in A Sharp Eye on Butterflies of Ghana.

== Taxonomy ==
Charaxes pleione is a member of the species group Charaxes paphianus. The supposed clade members are:

- Charaxes paphianus, nominate
- Charaxes pleione

== Realm ==
Afrotropical realm
