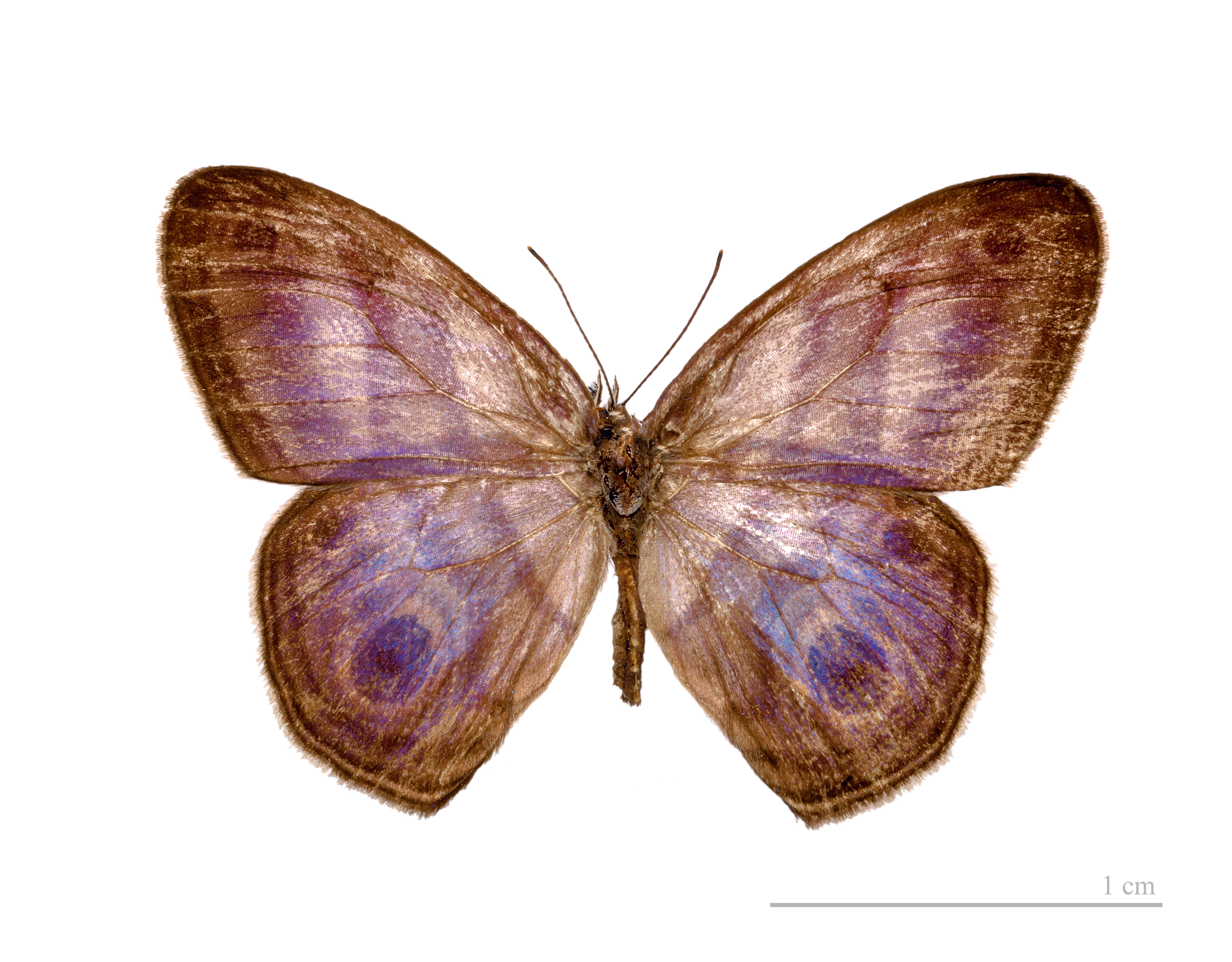
- Dorsal side
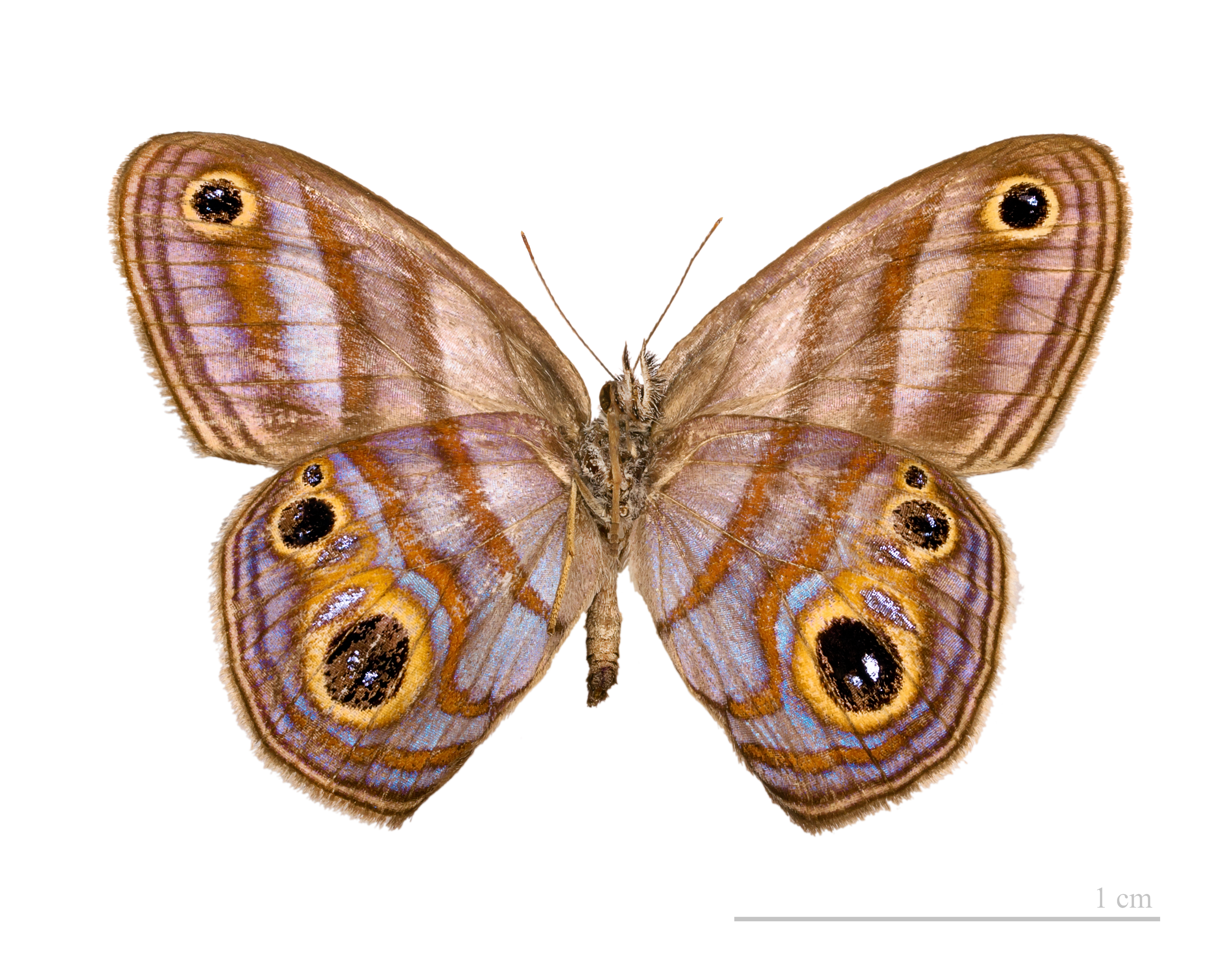
- Ventral side

Scientific classification
- Kingdom: Animalia
- Phylum: Arthropoda
- Class: Insecta
- Order: Lepidoptera
- Family: Nymphalidae
- Genus: Lazulina
- Species: L. hewitsonii

Binomial name
- Lazulina hewitsonii (Butler, 1867)

Synonyms
- Chloreuptychia hewitsonii (Butler, 1867); Euptychia hewitsonii Butler, 1867; Euptychia polla Möschler, 1883

= Lazulina hewitsonii =

Species of butterfly

Lazulina hewitsonii is a species of butterfly in the family Nymphalidae. It is found in Brazil (Pará), Suriname and Ecuador.
