= Origny =

- Commune
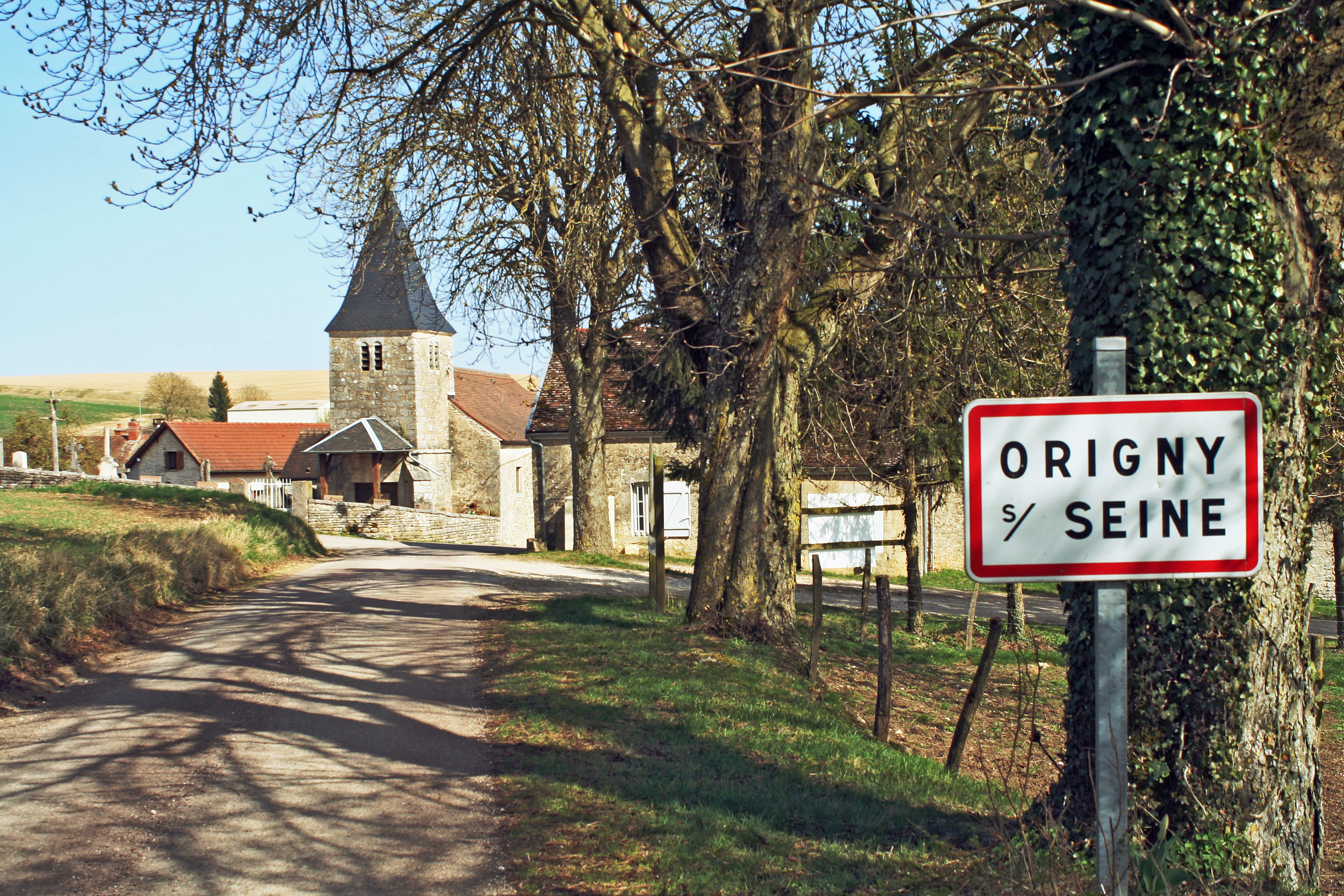
- The church and surroundings in Origny

- Coat of arms
- Location of Origny
- Location within France Location within Bourgogne-Franche-Comté
- Coordinates: 47°42′06″N 4°38′22″E
- Country: France
- Region: Bourgogne-Franche-Comté
- Department: Côte-d'Or
- Arrondissement: Montbard
- Canton: Châtillon-sur-Seine
- Intercommunality: Pays Châtillonnais

Government
  - Mayor (2020–2026): Patrice Baudry
- Area^{1}: 5.16 km^{2} (1.99 sq mi)
- Elevation: 162 m (531 ft)
- Highest elevation: 394 m (1,293 ft)
- Lowest elevation: 309 m (1,014 ft)
- Population (2023): 53
  - Density: 10/km^{2} (27/sq mi)
- Time zone: UTC+01:00 (CET)
  - Summer (DST): UTC+02:00 (CEST)
- INSEE/Postal code: 21470 /21510
- ^{1} French Land Register data, which excludes lakes, ponds, glaciers > 1 km^{2} (0.386 sq mi or 247 acres) and river estuaries.

Origny (French pronunciation: [ɔʁiɲi]) is a commune in the Côte-d'Or department in eastern France.

== Population ==
Historical population
Year	Pop.	±% p.a.
1968	69	—
1975	55	−3.19%
1982	41	−4.11%
1990	42	+0.30%
1999	37	−1.40%
2007	35	−0.69%
2012	45	+5.15%
2017	51	+2.53%
2023	53	+0.64%
Source: INSEE

== See also ==
- Communes of the Côte-d'Or department
