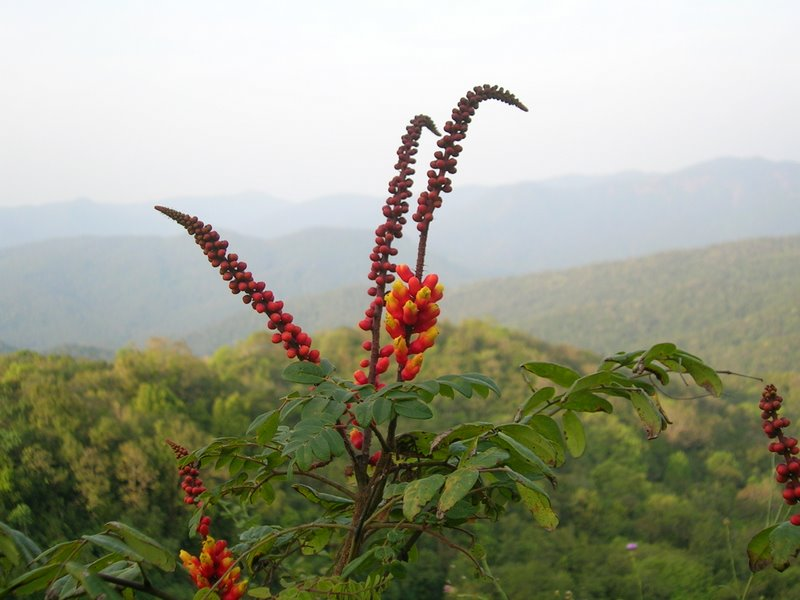
- Moullava spicata (India)

Scientific classification
- Kingdom: Plantae
- Clade: Tracheophytes
- Clade: Angiosperms
- Clade: Eudicots
- Clade: Rosids
- Order: Fabales
- Family: Fabaceae
- Subfamily: Caesalpinioideae
- Tribe: Caesalpinieae
- Genus: Moullava; Adans. (1763)

Type species
- Moullava spicata (Dalzell ex Wight) Nicolson

Species
- four; see text

Synonyms
- Almeloveenia Dennst. (1818); Caesalpinia sect. Cinclidocarpus (Zoll. & Moritzi) Benth. & Hook.; Cinclidocarpus Zoll. & Moritzi (1846); Wagatea Dalzell (1851)

= Moullava =

Genus of legumes

Moullava is a genus of flowering plants in the legume family, Fabaceae. It includes four species of lianas or scrambling shrubs native to tropical Africa from Cameroon to Tanzania and Angola, and to tropical Asia from India to Indochina, southern China, and western Malesia. Typical habitat includes forest margins of semi-evergreen seasonal tropical forest. It belongs to the subfamily Caesalpinioideae.

== Species ==
Moullava comprises the following species:

- Moullava digyna (Rottler) Gagnon & G.P.Lewis—Teri pod
- Moullava spicata (Dalzell ex Wight) Nicolson
- Moullava tortuosa (Roxb.) Gagnon & G.P.Lewis
- Moullava welwitschiana (Oliv.) Gagnon & G.P.Lewis
