= Jean-Baptiste Godart =

French entomologist

Jean-Baptiste Godart (25 November 1775 – 27 July 1825) was a French entomologist.

Born at Origny, Godart became impassioned by butterflies in his youth. He was charged by Pierre André Latreille (1762-1833) with writing the article on these insects in the Encyclopédie Méthodique. Godart then undertook his Histoire naturelle des lépidoptères ou papillons de France publication starting in 1821 and not completed until 1842. In addition to the fauna of France, it also covered exotic diurnal species.

== Sources ==
IJean Lhoste (1987), Les Entomologiste français, 1750–1950, INRA-OPIE.
