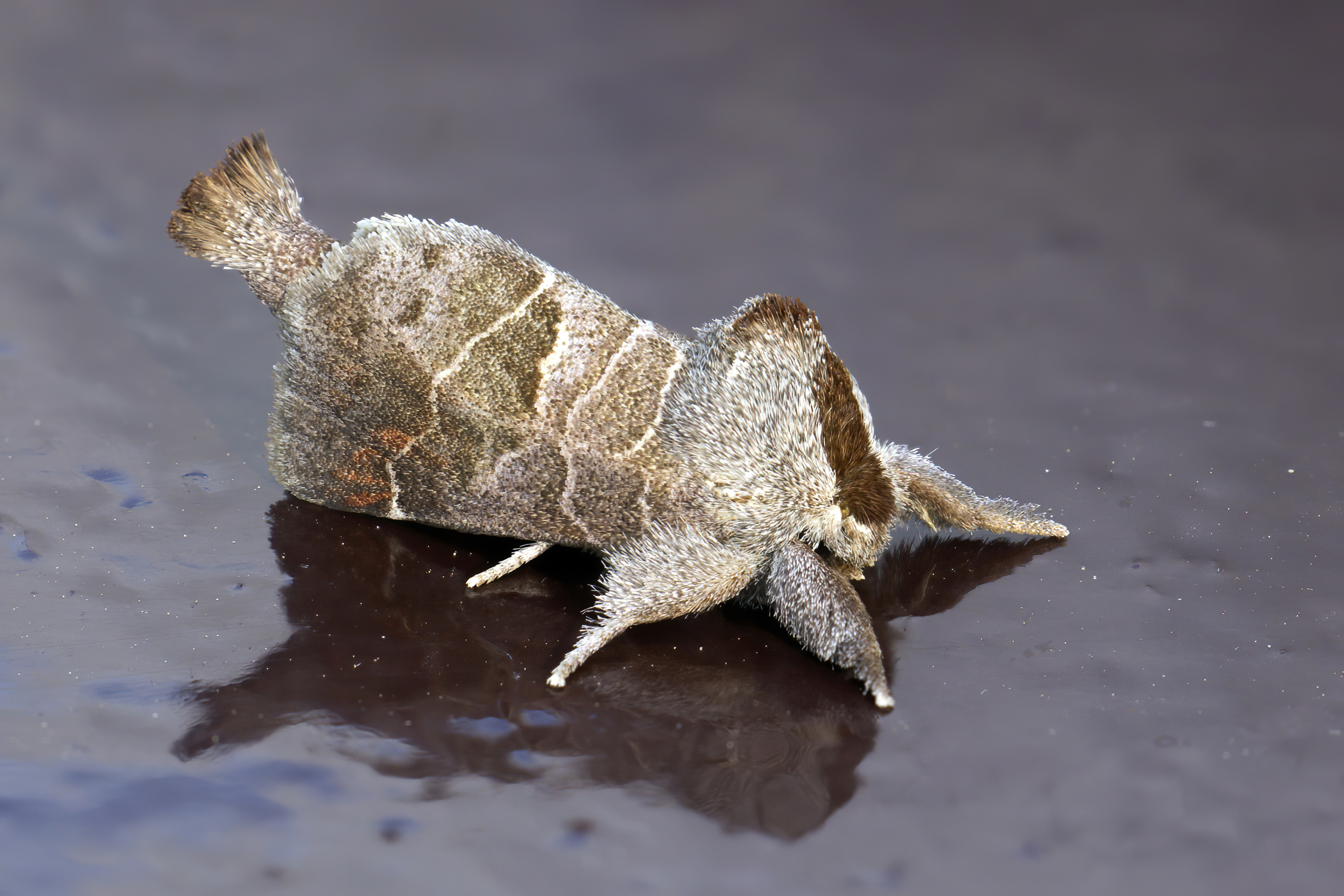
- Male, Danube delta, Romania

Scientific classification
- Domain: Eukaryota
- Kingdom: Animalia
- Phylum: Arthropoda
- Class: Insecta
- Order: Lepidoptera
- Superfamily: Noctuoidea
- Family: Notodontidae
- Genus: Clostera
- Species: C. pigra

Binomial name
- Clostera pigra (Hüfnagel, 1766)

Synonyms
- Pygaera pigra

= Clostera pigra =

Species of moth

Clostera pigra, the small chocolate-tip, is a moth of the family Notodontidae. The species was first described by Johann Siegfried Hufnagel in 1766. It is a Palearctic species found from Europe ranging to Morocco in the south and eastern Asia in the east.

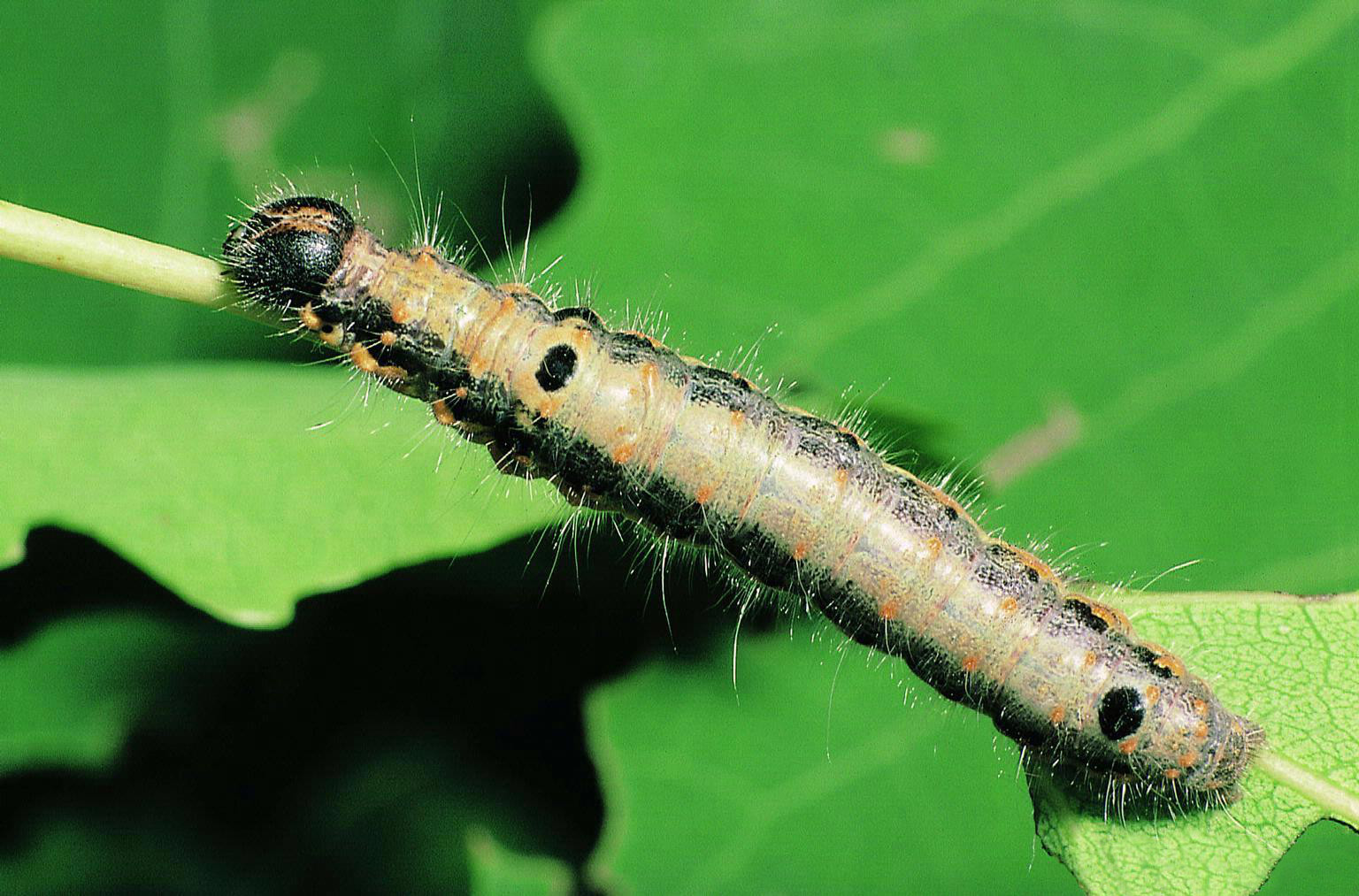
Larva

The wingspan is 22–27 mm. Imagos (adults) are dark brown to reddish brown and have several narrow, pale yellow lines on the front wings. A large maroon spot is located at the wing tip. The hindwings are dark brown. The thorax has densely dark reddish brown hairs on the back. The tip of the abdomen consists of a split tuft in males. The antennae are short and double combed. The teeth of the comb in the male are longer than in the female.

== Technical description ==
Smaller than anachoreta, with the ground-colour darker;the forewing strongly suffused with whitish grey to violet grey, particularly in the centre and at the distal margin; the 3 bands are represented by 3 prominent white lines. Subbasal and prediscal bands approach each other costally and are united at the hind margin. A red-brown spot between postdiscal band and apex of wing. Also of this species a lighter variety and a darker one occur: obscurior Stgr.[now full species Clostera obscurior (Staudinger, 1887)], with the ground-colour very deep dark brown, is found in Central and East Asia; and ferruginea Stgr., with the ground bright rust-brown, has been described from southern Asia Minor. — Egg semiglobular, flesh- colour. Larva ashy grey to blackish grey, or with a greenish tint, hair grey-yellow, the hump on segments 1 and 8 of abdomen flat, black; 2 longitudinal rows of yellow lateral small warts in dark spots, also a ventro-lateral, yellow, interrupted double stripe, in which the black spiracles are placed. On Salix and Aspen. Pupa glossy red-brown with dark wing-cases, in a whitish grey web.

== Biology ==
The moth flies from May to August in two generations depending on the location.

The larvae feed on Populus and Salix species.

== Sources ==
- P.C.-Rougeot, P. Viette (1978). Guide des papillons nocturnes d'Europe et d'Afrique du Nord. Delachaux et Niestlé (Lausanne).
