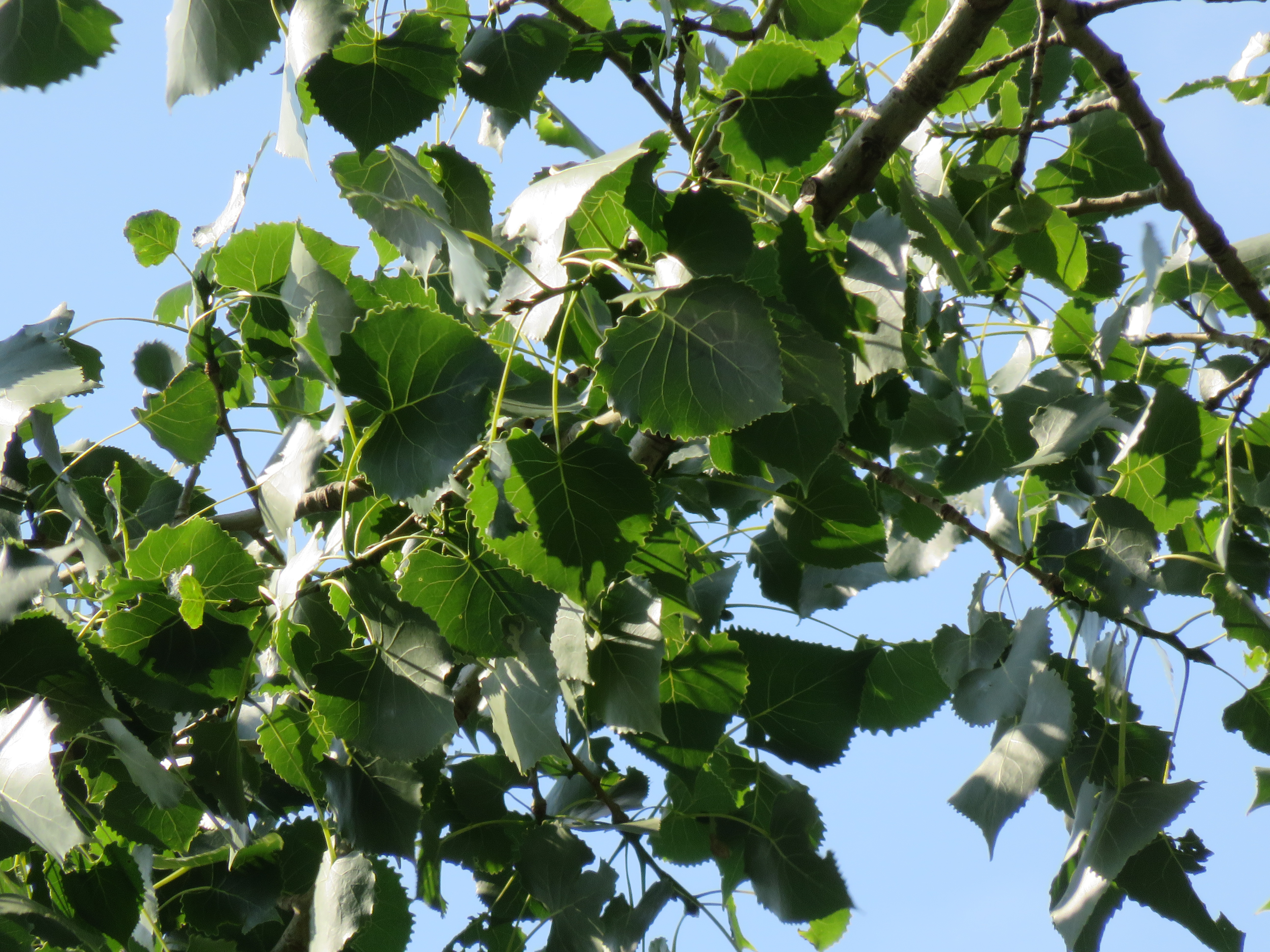
- Foliage

Conservation status
- Least Concern (IUCN 3.1)

- Secure (NatureServe)

Scientific classification
- Kingdom: Plantae
- Clade: Tracheophytes
- Clade: Angiosperms
- Clade: Eudicots
- Clade: Rosids
- Order: Malpighiales
- Family: Salicaceae
- Genus: Populus
- Section: Populus sect. Aigeiros
- Species: P. deltoides

Binomial name
- Populus deltoides W.Bartram ex Marshall
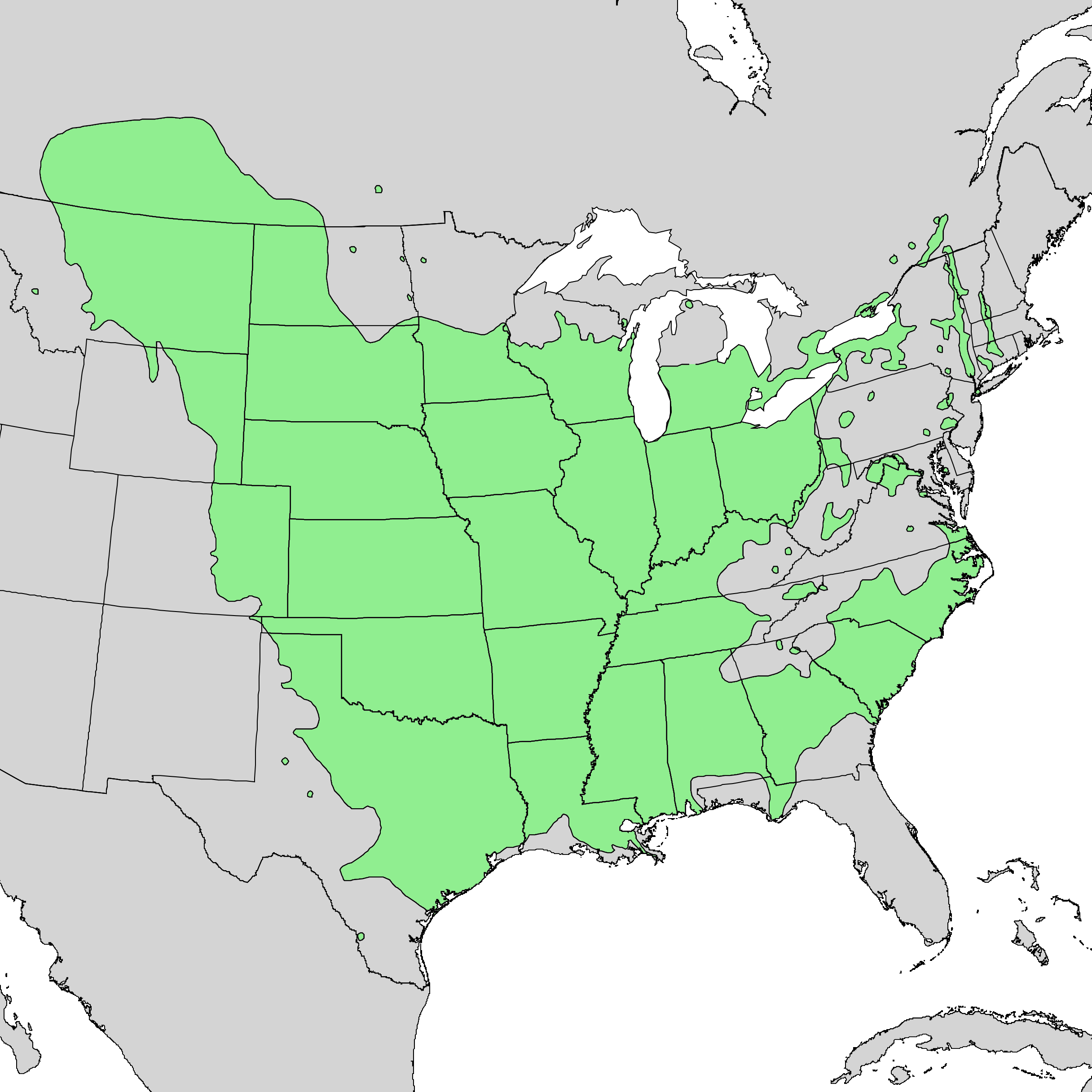
- Native range, subsp. wislizeni not shown

= Populus deltoides =

Eastern cottonwood

Species of tree

Populus deltoides, the eastern cottonwood or necklace poplar, is a species of cottonwood poplar native to North America, growing throughout the eastern, central, and southwestern United States as well as the southern Canadian prairies, the southernmost part of eastern Canada, and northeastern Mexico.

== Description ==
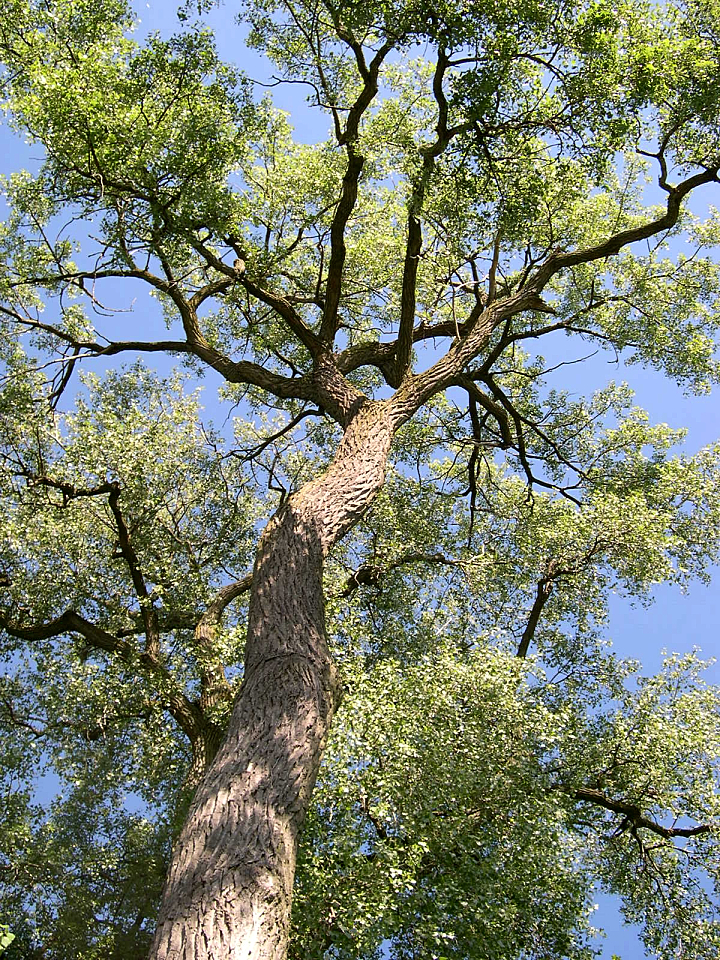
A mature tree

Populus deltoides is a large tree growing to 20–30 m (65–100 ft) tall and with a trunk up to 2.8 m (9 ft 2 in) diameter, one of the largest North American hardwood trees. The bark is silvery-white, smooth or lightly fissured when young, becoming dark gray and deeply fissured on old trees.

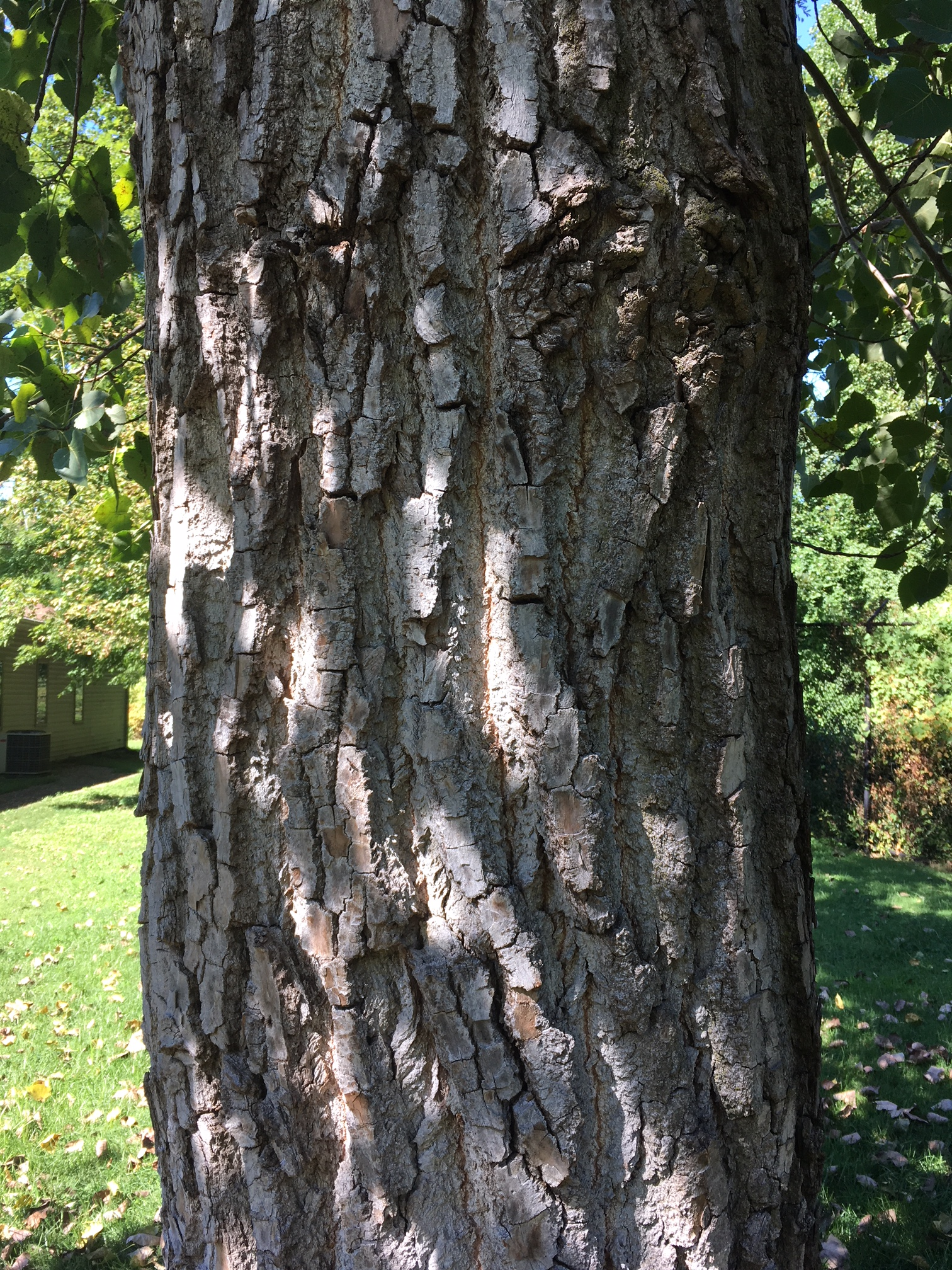
Bark of a mature tree

The twigs are grayish-yellow and stout, with large triangular leaf scars. The winter buds are slender, pointed, 1–2 cm (1/2–3/4 in) long, yellowish brown, and resinous. It is one of the fastest growing trees in North America. In Mississippi River bottoms, height growth of 3–5 m (10–15 ft) per year for a few years has been seen. Sustained growth of 1.5 meters (5 ft) in height and 2.5 centimeters (1 in) in diameter per year for 25 years is common.

The leaves are large, deltoid (triangular), 4–10 cm (1 1/2–4 in) long and 4–11 cm (1 1/2–4 1/4 in) broad with a truncated (flattened) base and a petiole 3–12 cm (1 1/4–4 3/4 in) long. The leaf is very coarsely toothed, the teeth are curved and gland tipped, and the petiole is flat; they are dark green in the summer and turn yellow in the fall (but many cottonwoods in dry locations drop their leaves early from the combination of drought and leaf rust, making their fall color dull or absent). Due to the flat stem of the leaf, the leaf has the tendency to shake from even the slightest breeze. This is one of the identifying characteristics.

It is dioecious, with the flowers (catkins) produced on single-sex trees in early spring. The male (pollen) catkins are reddish-purple and 8–10 cm (3 1/4–4 in) long; the female catkins are green, 7–13 cm (2 3/4–5 in) long at pollination, maturing 15–20 cm (6–7 3/4 in) long with several 6-to-15-millimeter (1/4-to-9/16-inch) seed capsules (samaras) in early summer, which split open to release the numerous small seeds attached to cotton-like strands. A single tree may release 40 million seeds a season.

== Variation ==
The species is divided into three subspecies or up to five varieties. The subspecies classification is as follows:

- Populus deltoides subsp. deltoides, eastern cottonwood is found in southeastern Canada (the south of Ontario and Quebec) and the eastern United States (throughout, west to North Dakota to Texas).
- P. d. monilifera (Aiton) Eckenw., the plains cottonwood (syn. P. deltoides var. occidentalis Rydb.; P. sargentii Dode) ranges from southcentral Canada (southern Alberta, Saskatchewan, and Manitoba) to the central United States and south to northern New Mexico and Texas. It is the state tree of Wyoming.
- P. d. wislizeni (S.Watson) Eckenw., the Rio Grande cottonwood (syn. P. wislizeni (S.Watson) Sarg.; P. fremontii var. wislizeni S.Watson) grows from southern Colorado south through Texas to northeastern Mexico (Chihuahua, San Luis Potosi), and west to Arizona. GRIN records its presence in California; the Jepson Flora of California does not. Some sources identify this subspecies by the epithet "wislizenii"; per ICN article 60C.2, the spelling is with one "i".

== Range ==
The range of the eastern cottonwood is very large, stretching from southwestern Mexico northwards to the southern provinces of Canada and from New Hampshire to Oregon. In Mexico, it is mainly present as subspecies wislizeni and it is native only to the state of Jalisco in the southwest. In the northwest, it only grows in the state of Sonora. In contrast, it is found in about half the states of northeastern Mexico including Aguascalientes, Coahuila, Chihuahua, Durango, Nuevo León, and Zacatecas. It is also present in the Gulf Coast state of Veracruz.

In the southwestern United States, the species is native as far west as a few locations in Utah and Arizona according to the USDA Natural Resources Conservation Service (NRCS) and is fairly widespread in both New Mexico and Texas. In the Pacific Northwest, Plants of the World Online (POWO) reports it as native to Washington, Oregon, and Idaho, however the NRCS only reports as far west as Montana, Wyoming, and Colorado. To the east, it is native to every state of the central and southeastern United States, including Florida along northern parts of the Gulf Coast. The NRCS also reports in every state of the northeast, but POWO does not list it in Maine or Rhode Island.

In Canada, eastern cottonwoods grow in the most southerly edge of Quebec and southern areas of Ontario, mainly near Lake Ontario and Lake Erie. To the west, they are widespread into southern Alberta, Saskatchewan, and Manitoba. It is also reported as native to British Columbia by both the NRCS and POWO.

== Ecology ==
Eastern cottonwood needs bare soil and full sun for successful germination and establishment; in natural conditions, it usually grows near rivers, with mud banks left after floods providing ideal conditions for seedling germination; human soil cultivation has allowed it to increase its range away from such habitats.

Clonal reproduction producing stands does occur in Populus deltoides, though to a more limited degree than in related species such as Populus tremuloides or quaking aspen, and it will resprout readily when cut down.

The leaves serve as food for caterpillars of various Lepidoptera, including poplar tentmakers, redhumped caterpillars and fall webworms.

== Uses ==
The wood of eastern cottonwood is typical of the Populus family in its softness, weighing just 0.45 g/cm^{3} (28 pounds per cubic foot). It is utilized for things like plywood and interior parts of furniture.

General Custer fed his horses and mules the bark during the 1868–69 winter campaign against Native American tribes south of Arkansas. According to Charles Goodnight, cowboys afflicted with gastric disorders would make an astringent tea from the inner bark.

== Oldest and largest ==
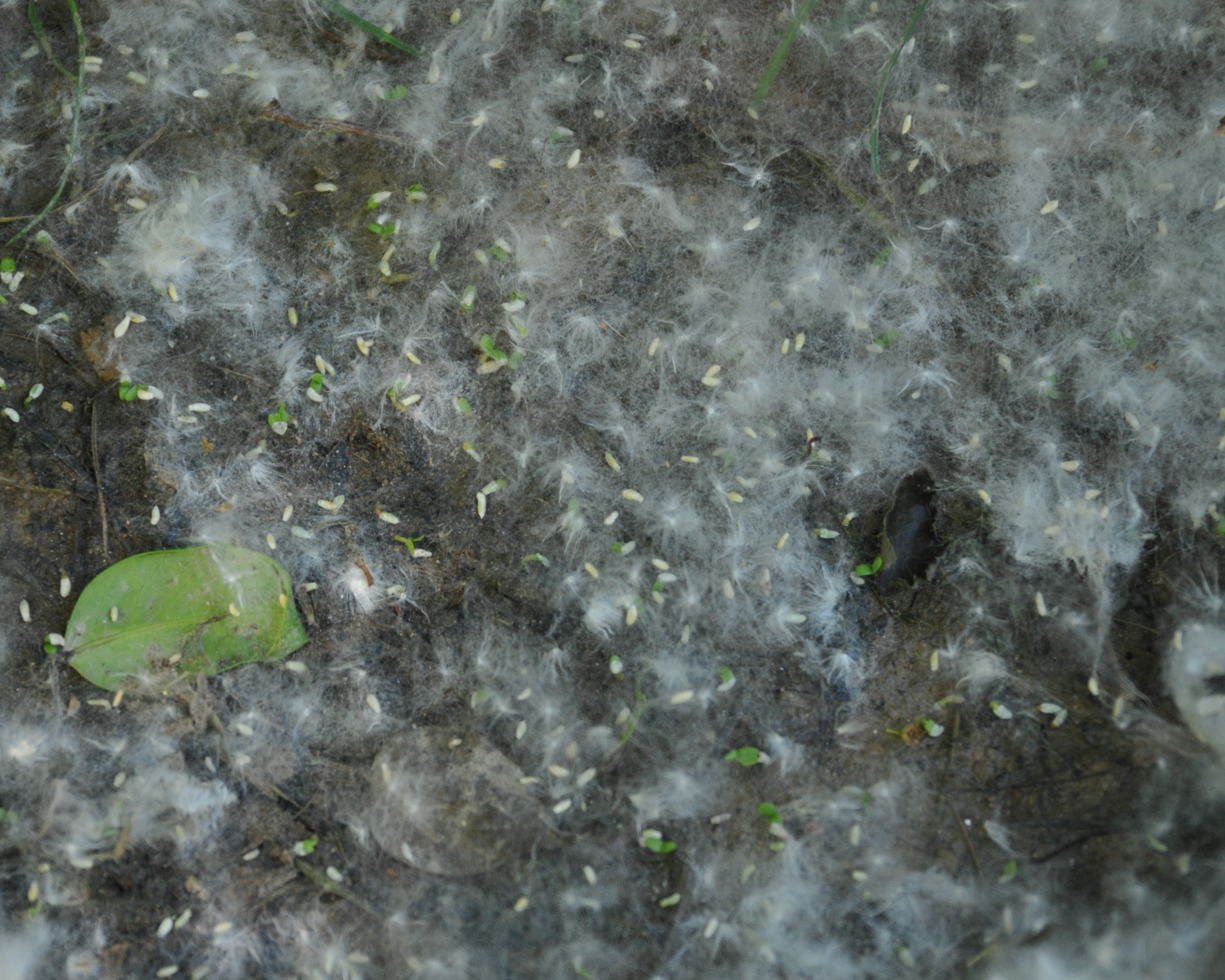
Seeds and seed hairs from an eastern cottonwood

Eastern cottonwoods typically live 70–100 years, but they have the potential to live 200–400 years in ideal conditions.

The Balmville Tree (felled in 2015 at approximately 316 years old) was the oldest eastern cottonwood in the United States.

- The US national champion Populus deltoides var. deltoides is located in Beatrice, Nebraska and measures 27 m (88 ft) tall, 33 m (108 ft) wide.
- The US national champion Populus deltoides var. monilifera is located in Ravalli County, Montana and measures 34 m (112 ft) tall, 29 m (94 ft) wide.
- The US national champion Populus deltoides var. wislizeni is located in Bernalillo County, New Mexico and measures 26 m (84 ft) tall, 25 m (83 ft) wide.

The largest recorded cottonwood tree in the world is the Frimley Park tree located in Hastings, New Zealand and measures 42 m (138 ft) tall, 34 m (111 ft) wide and 10.2 m (33.4 ft) in girth. This cottonwood was planted in the 1870s.

== Symbolism ==
Calling the cottonwood tree "the pioneer of the prairie", the Kansas state legislature designated the cottonwood the official state tree of Kansas in 1937. It became the state tree of Wyoming in 1947, and that of Nebraska since 1972.

== See also ==
- Populus section Aigeiros
- Black Hawk Tree, individual cottonwood tree in Prairie du Chien, Wisconsin
