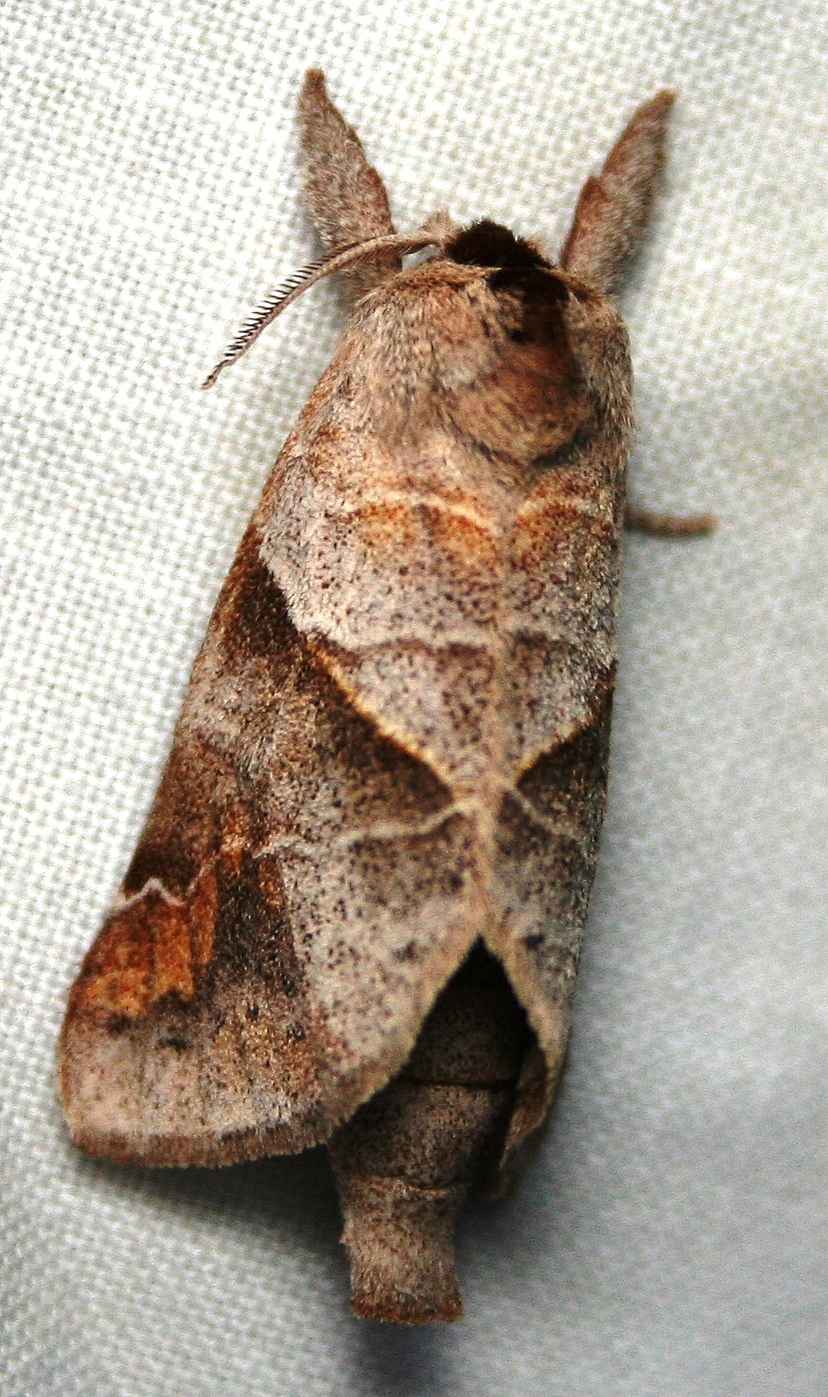

Scientific classification
- Domain: Eukaryota
- Kingdom: Animalia
- Phylum: Arthropoda
- Class: Insecta
- Order: Lepidoptera
- Superfamily: Noctuoidea
- Family: Notodontidae
- Genus: Clostera
- Species: C. albosigma

Binomial name
- Clostera albosigma Fitch, 1856

= Clostera albosigma =

Sigmoid prominent

Species of moth

Clostera albosigma, the sigmoid prominent, is a moth of the family Notodontidae. The species was first described by Asa Fitch in 1856. It is found in North America from Newfoundland west to Vancouver Island, north to the Great Slave Lake and the Northwest Territories and south to at least Missouri.

The wingspan is 28–38 mm. The moth flies from May to August depending on the location.

The larvae feed on poplar and willow.
