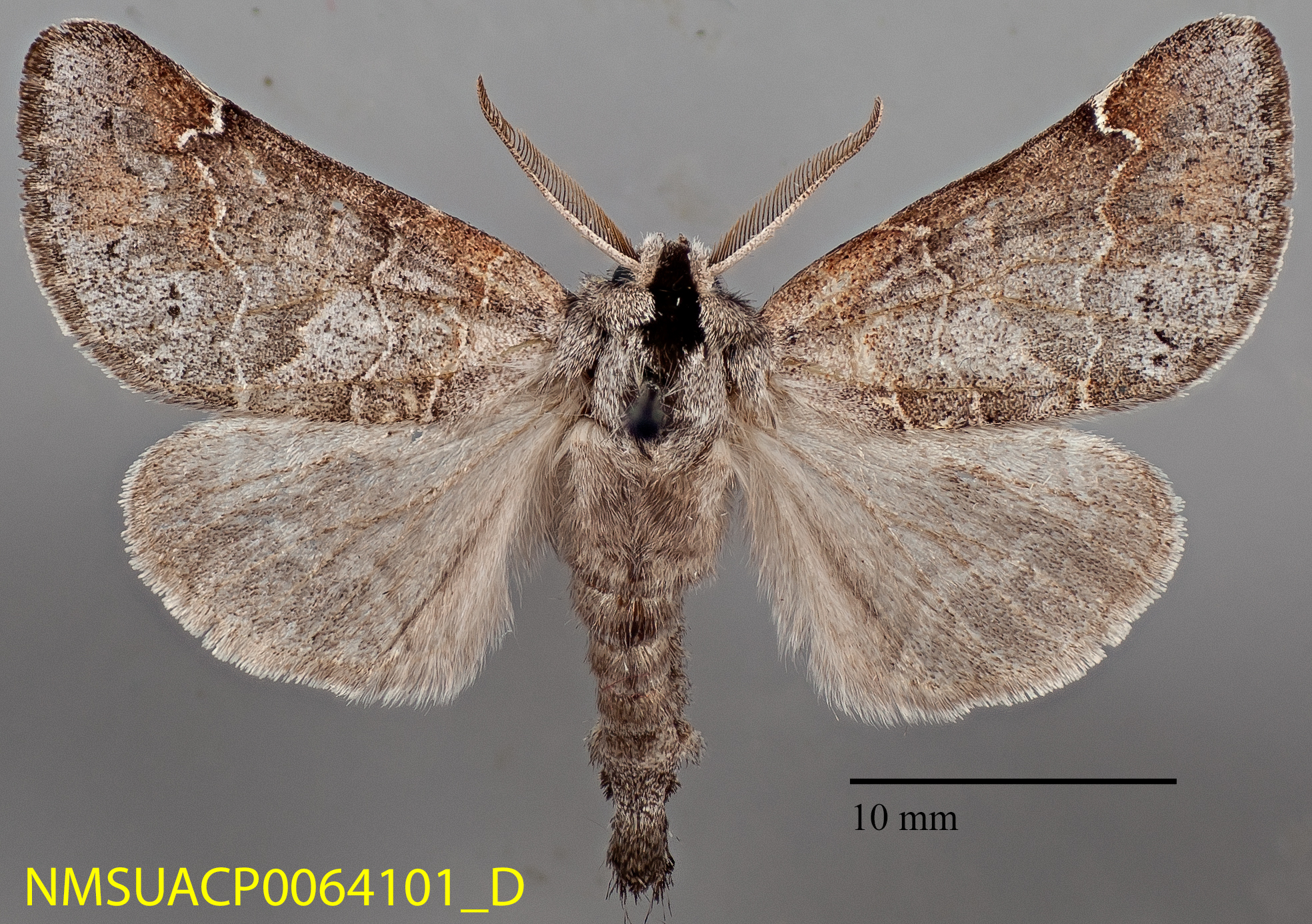

Scientific classification
- Kingdom: Animalia
- Phylum: Arthropoda
- Class: Insecta
- Order: Lepidoptera
- Superfamily: Noctuoidea
- Family: Notodontidae
- Genus: Clostera
- Species: C. paraphora

Binomial name
- Clostera paraphora (Dyar, 1921)

= Clostera paraphora =

Species of moth

Clostera paraphora is a species of moth in the family Notodontidae (the prominents). It was first described by Harrison Gray Dyar Jr. in 1921 and it is found in North America.

The MONA or Hodges number for Clostera paraphora is 7899.
