= Black Hawk Tree =

Tree in Prairie du Chien, Wisconsin, United States

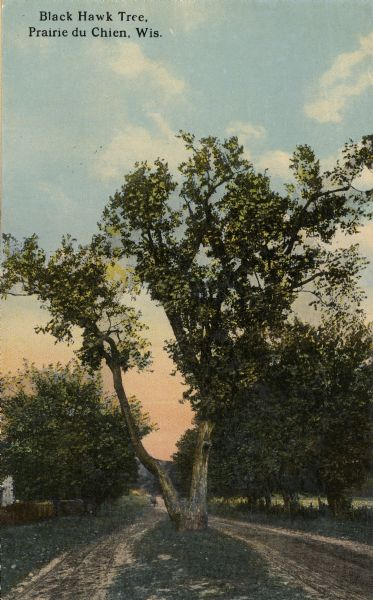
A 1915 postcard of the Black Hawk Tree

The Black Hawk Tree, or Black Hawk's Tree, was a cottonwood tree located in Prairie du Chien, Wisconsin, United States. Local legend held that Sauk leader Black Hawk used it to elude his pursuers, though there are differing details and versions of the story. One version puts Black Hawk's presence in the tree during the 1790s, while another states it was after the conclusion of the 1832 Black Hawk War and involved a young Lieutenant Jefferson Davis. In reality, it is unlikely that Black Hawk ever used the tree to hide, though he was probably in Prairie du Chien once after his surrender at the end of the 1832 Black Hawk War. The tree was felled by a windstorm during the 1920s.

== Background ==
Local lore in Prairie du Chien held that the Sauk leader Black Hawk had once hidden in a cottonwood tree that was located in the city. In one version of the tale, the tree was said to have been used by Black Hawk during the 1790s to evade capture from troops stationed at Fort Crawford. Black Hawk would later become famous for his role in leading a band of Sauk and Meskwaki, known as the British Band, back into Illinois in violation of several disputed treaties. The event triggered the Black Hawk War of 1832.

Another version of the story held that one day, after his capture following the Black Hawk War, he was being escorted by Lieutenant Jefferson Davis and managed to escape. While eluding his pursuers, it is said, Black Hawk hid himself among the branches of the tree. This version of the story appeared in the LaCrosse Tribune in 1922; even then, the story noted, there were those who pronounced the tale a "myth."

== Tree ==
In reality, the local legend is probably untrue. Most historians believe that while Black Hawk was in Prairie du Chien once, it was not until after the decisive battle of the Black Hawk War at the mouth of the Bad Axe River. By this time, in August 1832, Black Hawk had surrendered to the custody of the Ho-Chunk and could not have hidden in the tree. Regardless of the veracity of the tale, the tree was unique in a settled area that had few trees and a large population utilizing wood for various purposes. A 1906 article in the Prairie du Chien Union debunked the popular tale, outlining the ownership of the property, the writer's interviews with the subjects, and their assertion that the tree was not planted until at least the 1840s. The same article went on to assert the tree had a right to "importance and honorable mention" because of its namesake and the injustices he faced during the 1832 "war of extermination."

Newspaper accounts stated that visitors purposely passed the tree in automobiles and many stopped to view the tree. By 1922, the once two-trunked tree was reduced to one trunk and was in decline. During a windstorm in the 1920s, the Black Hawk Tree was destroyed, but even after its death the site continued to be marked. The Black Hawk Tree is, without question, the most well-known tree in the Prairie du Chien area and part of local lore. The Black Hawk Tree, like other trees in Wisconsin such as the Hanerville Oak, was so revered that the road was detoured around it to save it from being cut down.

Even after the tree's destruction, and certainty that the tale is not true, the legend persists. When the tree came down, the road it grew from was renamed from Bluff Street to Black Hawk Avenue. A piece of wood, purportedly from the Black Hawk Tree, hangs in the museum at Fort Crawford in Prairie du Chien.

== See also ==
- List of individual trees
