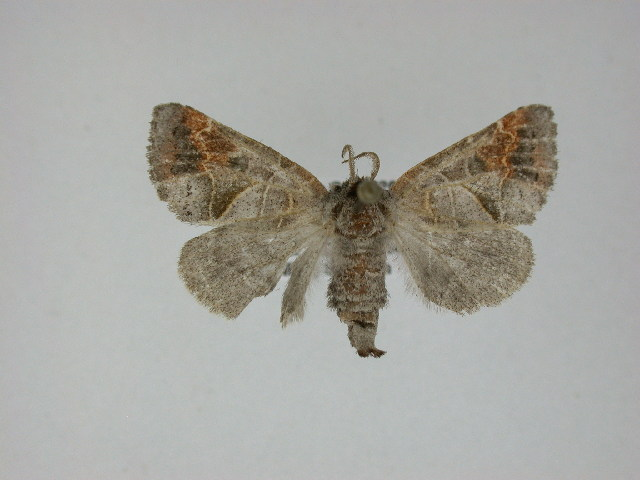

Scientific classification
- Kingdom: Animalia
- Phylum: Arthropoda
- Class: Insecta
- Order: Lepidoptera
- Superfamily: Noctuoidea
- Family: Notodontidae
- Genus: Clostera
- Species: C. apicalis

Binomial name
- Clostera apicalis (Walker, 1855)

Synonyms
- Ichthyura apicalis Walker, 1855

= Clostera apicalis =

Species of moth

Clostera apicalis, the apical prominent or red-marked tentmaker, is a species of moth in the family Notodontidae (the prominents). It was first described by Francis Walker in 1855 and it is found in North America.

== Subspecies ==
Two subspecies belong to Clostera apicalis:

- Clostera apicalis apicalis (Walker, 1855)^{i g}
- Clostera apicalis ornata (Grote and Robinson, 1868)^{i c g}

Data sources: i = ITIS, c = Catalogue of Life, g = GBIF, b = BugGuide
