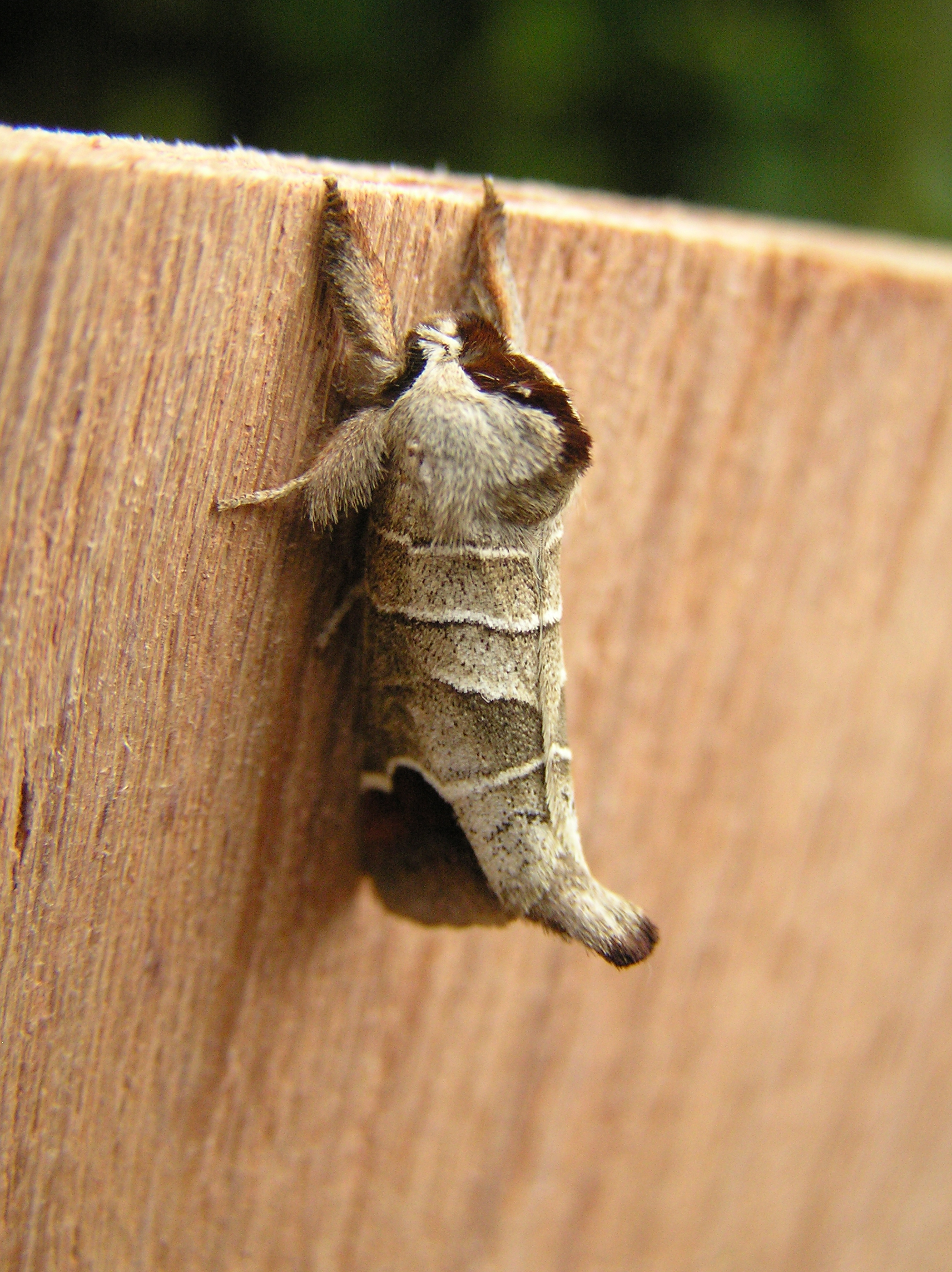

Scientific classification
- Kingdom: Animalia
- Phylum: Arthropoda
- Class: Insecta
- Order: Lepidoptera
- Superfamily: Noctuoidea
- Family: Notodontidae
- Genus: Clostera
- Species: C. curtula

Binomial name
- Clostera curtula (Linnaeus, 1758)

= Clostera curtula =

Chocolate-tip

Species of moth

Clostera curtula, the chocolate-tip, is a moth of the family Notodontidae. It was first described by Carl Linnaeus in his 1758 10th edition of Systema Naturae and it is found in Europe ranging to Siberia.

The wingspan is 27–35 mm. The moth flies from April to September depending on the location.

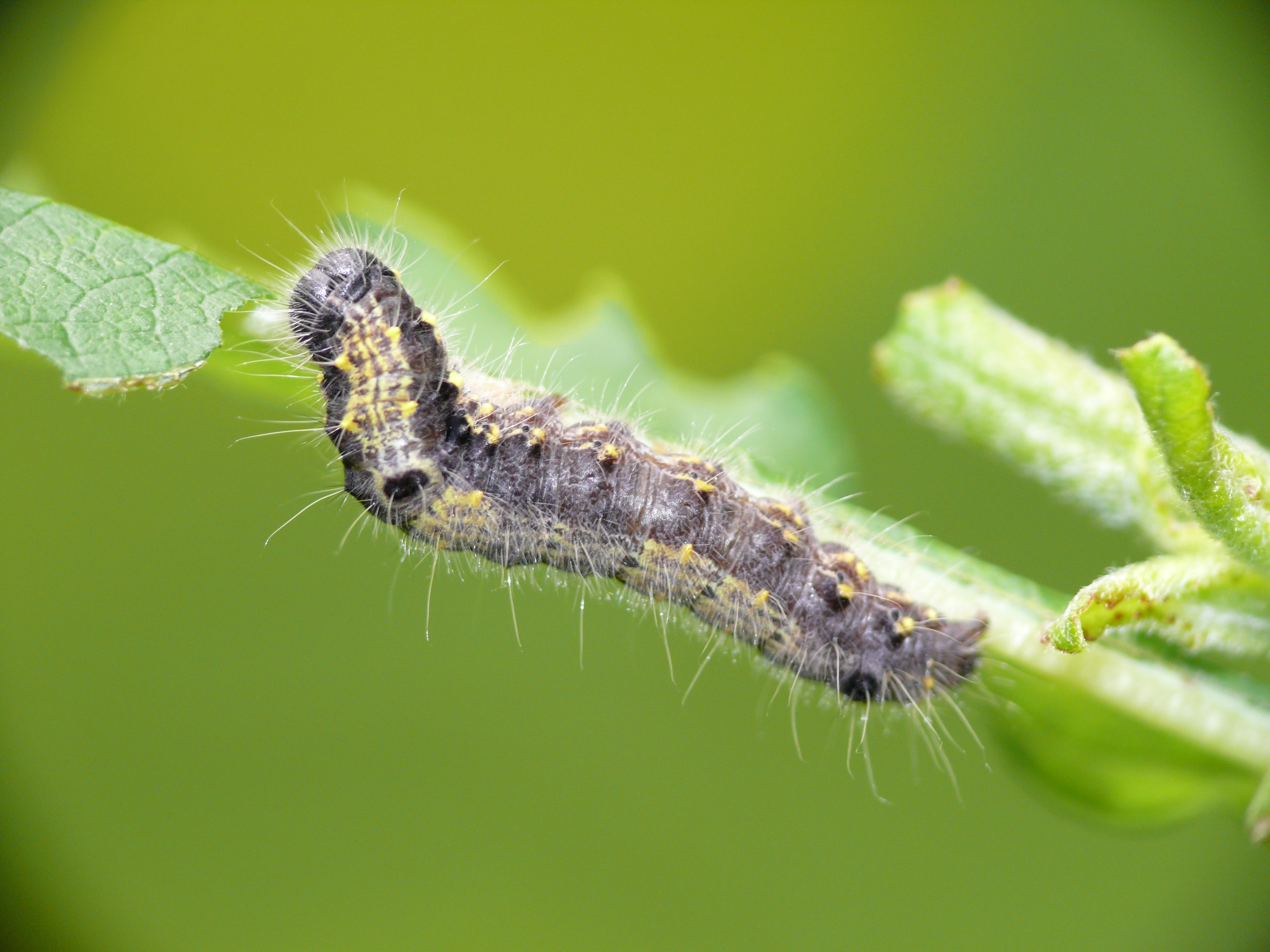
Caterpillar

The larvae feed on poplar, primarily Populus tremula, and willow.
