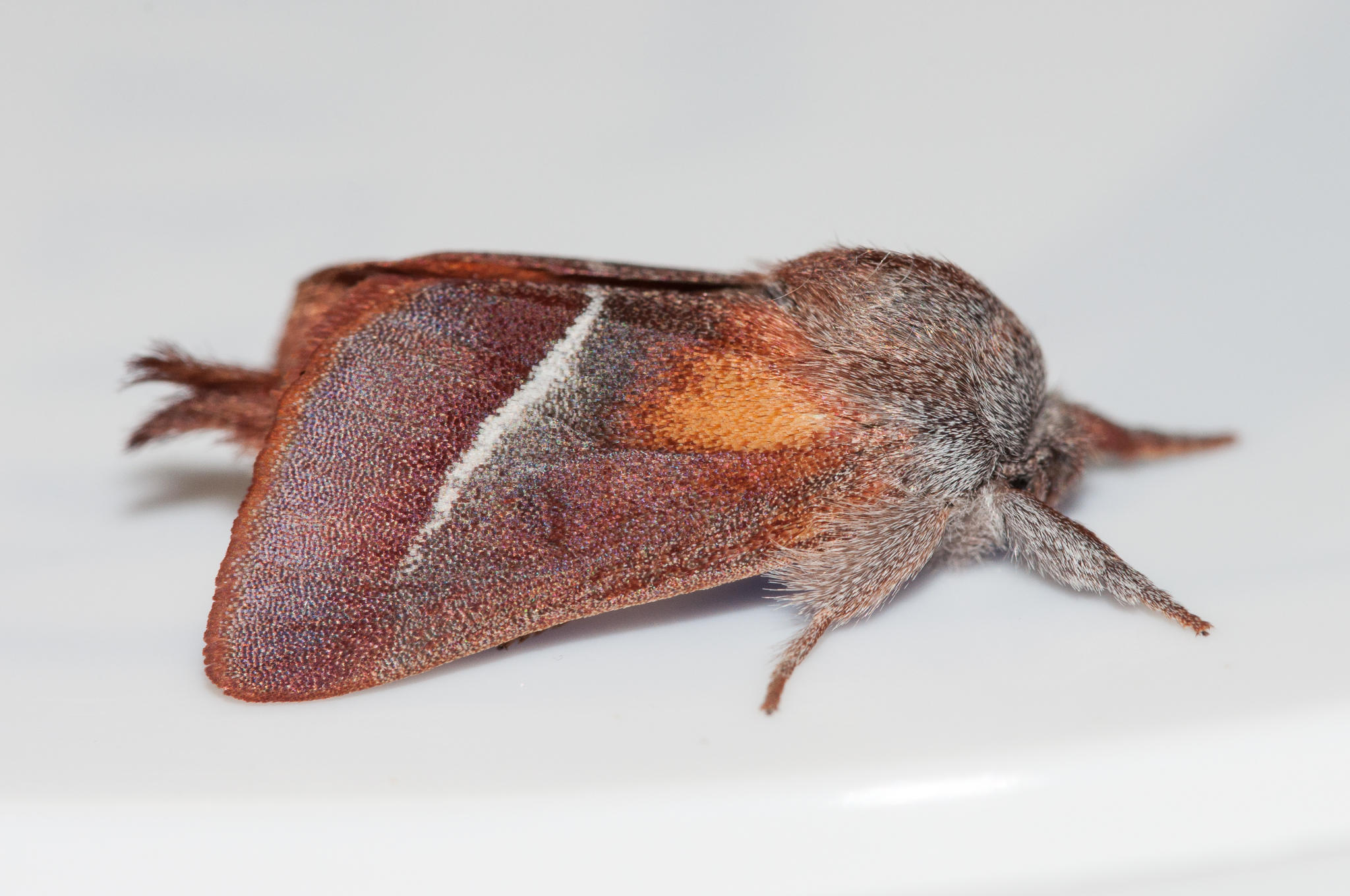
- Clostera limacodina

Scientific classification
- Kingdom: Animalia
- Phylum: Arthropoda
- Class: Insecta
- Order: Lepidoptera
- Superfamily: Noctuoidea
- Family: Notodontidae
- Subfamily: Pygaerinae
- Genus: Clostera; Samouelle, 1819

Synonyms
- Ichthyura; Melalopha

= Clostera =

Genus of moths

Clostera is a genus of moths of the family Notodontidae. It consists of the following species:

- Clostera aello (Schintlmeister & Fang, 2001)
- Clostera albosigma (Fitch, 1856)
- Clostera anachoreta (Denis & Schiffermüller, 1775)
- Clostera anastomosis (Linnaeus, 1758)
- Clostera angularis (Snellen, 1895)
- Clostera apicalis (Walker, 1855)
- Clostera bramah (Roepke, 1944)
- Clostera bramoides (Holloway, 1983)
- Clostera brucei (H. Edwards, 1885)
- Clostera costicomma (Hampson, 1892)
- Clostera curtula (Linnaeus, 1758)
- Clostera curtuloides (Erschoff, 1870)
- Clostera dorsalis (Walker, 1862)
- Clostera ferruginea (Hampson, 1910)
- Clostera fulgurita (Walker, 1865)
- ? Clostera hildora (Schaus)
- Clostera inclusa (Hübner, 1829)
- Clostera inornata (Neumoegen, 1882)
- ? Clostera javana (Moore)
- Clostera obscurior (Staudinger, 1887)
- Clostera pallida (Walker, 1855)
- Clostera paraphora (Dyar, 1921)
- Clostera pigra (Hufnagel, 1766)
- Clostera powelli (Oberthür, 1914)
- Clostera restitura (Walker, 1865)
- Clostera rubida (Druce, 1901)
- Clostera strigosa (Grote, 1882)
- ? Clostera tapa (Roepke)
- ? Clostera transecta (Dudgeon)
- Clostera voeltzkowi (Aurivilius, 1909)
