= Clostera powelli =

Scientific classification
- Domain: Eukaryota
- Kingdom: Animalia
- Phylum: Arthropoda
- Class: Insecta
- Order: Lepidoptera
- Superfamily: Noctuoidea
- Family: Notodontidae
- Genus: Clostera
- Species: C. powelli

Binomial name
- Clostera powelli Oberthür, 1913

Species of moth

Clostera powelli is a moth of the family Notodontidae. It is found in North Africa, more specifically in Morocco and Algeria.

The wingspan is 13–15 mm. The moth flies from April to October in two generations depending on the location.

The larvae feed on Populus and Salix species.

== Sources ==
- P.C.-Rougeot, P. Viette (1978). Guide des papillons nocturnes d'Europe et d'Afrique du Nord. Delachaux et Niestlé (Lausanne).
