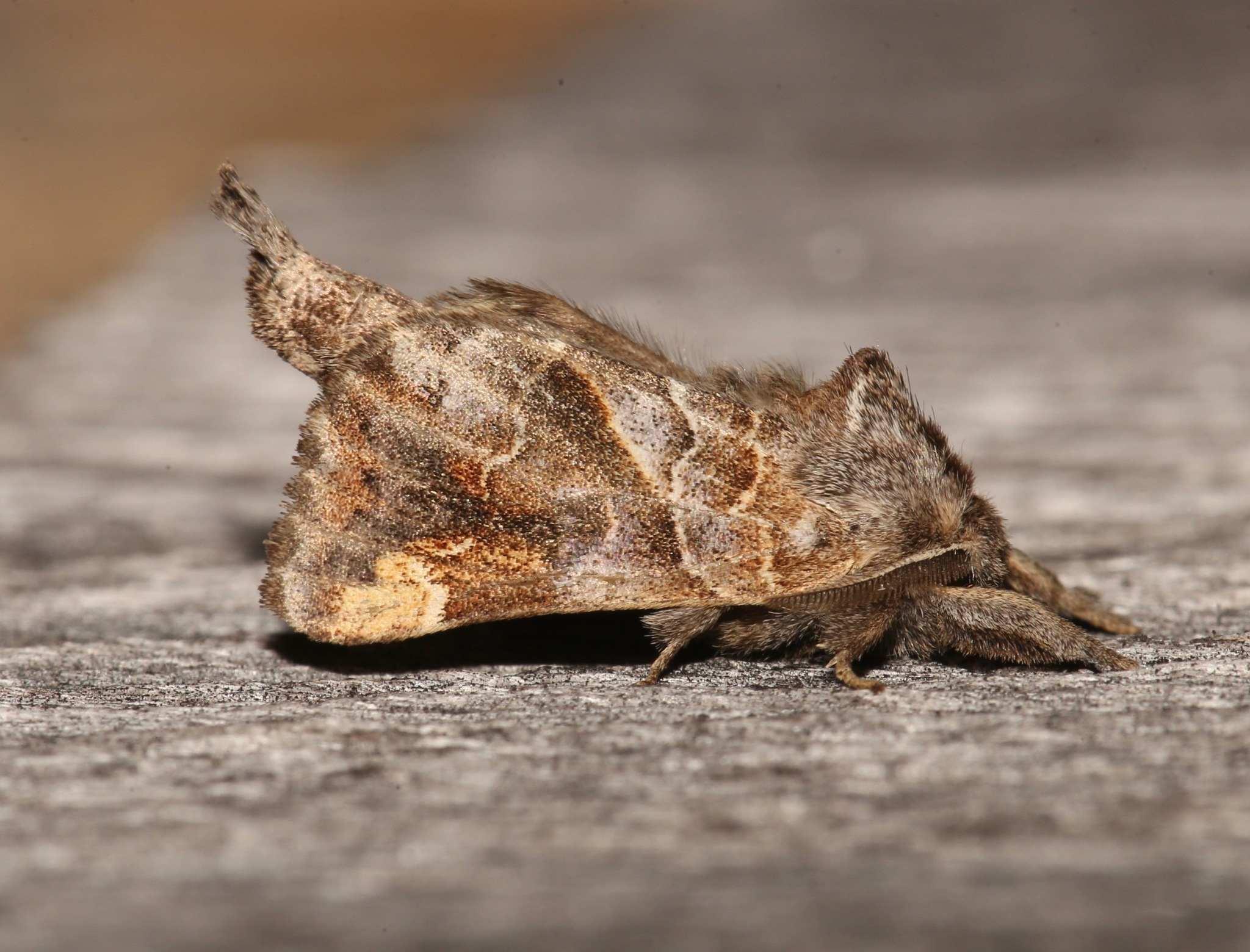

Scientific classification
- Kingdom: Animalia
- Phylum: Arthropoda
- Class: Insecta
- Order: Lepidoptera
- Superfamily: Noctuoidea
- Family: Notodontidae
- Genus: Clostera
- Species: C. strigosa

Binomial name
- Clostera strigosa (Grote, 1882)

= Clostera strigosa =

Species of moth

Clostera strigosa, the striped chocolate-tip or drab tent-maker moth, is a species of moth in the family Notodontidae (the prominents). It was first described by Augustus Radcliffe Grote in 1882 and it is found in North America.

The MONA or Hodges number for Clostera strigosa is 7898.
