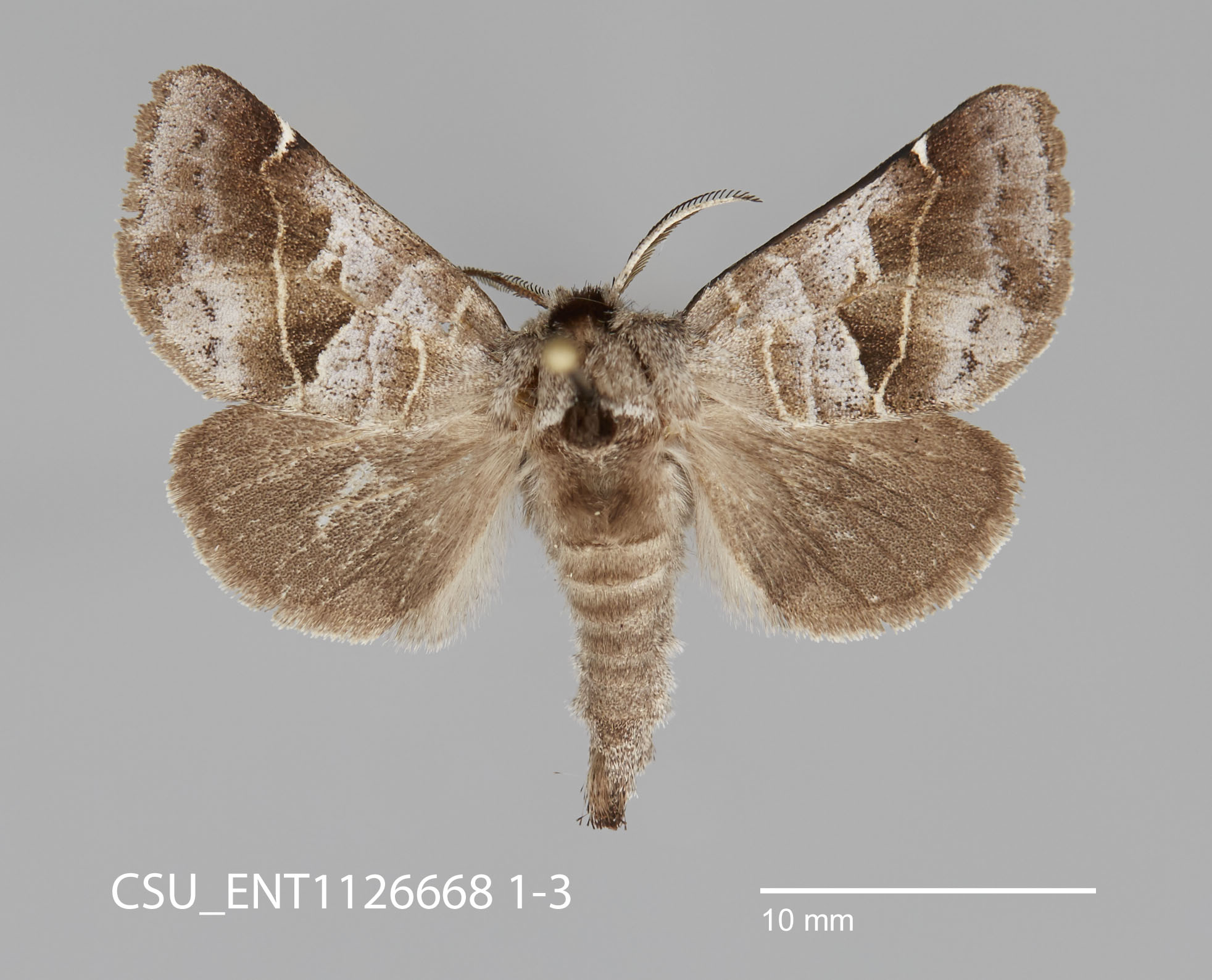
- C.P. Gillette Museum of Arthropod Diversity Catalog #: CSU_ENT1126668 Taxon: Clostera brucei (H. Edwards, 1885) Family: Notodontidae Collector: B.K. Bartell  Date: 2012-06-02 Locality: United States, Colorado, Gilpin, Golden Gate Canyon 39.838903 -105.425844 +-1988m. WGS84 Elevation: 2682 meters Verbatim Elevation: 8800' Life Stage: Adult

Scientific classification
- Kingdom: Animalia
- Phylum: Arthropoda
- Clade: Pancrustacea
- Class: Insecta
- Order: Lepidoptera
- Superfamily: Noctuoidea
- Family: Notodontidae
- Genus: Clostera
- Species: C. brucei

Binomial name
- Clostera brucei (H. Edwards, 1885)

= Clostera brucei =

Species of insect

Clostera brucei, commonly known as Bruce's prominent moth or Bruce's chocolate-tip, is a species of moth in the family Notodontidae (the prominents). It was first described by Henry Edwards in 1885 and it is found in North America.
