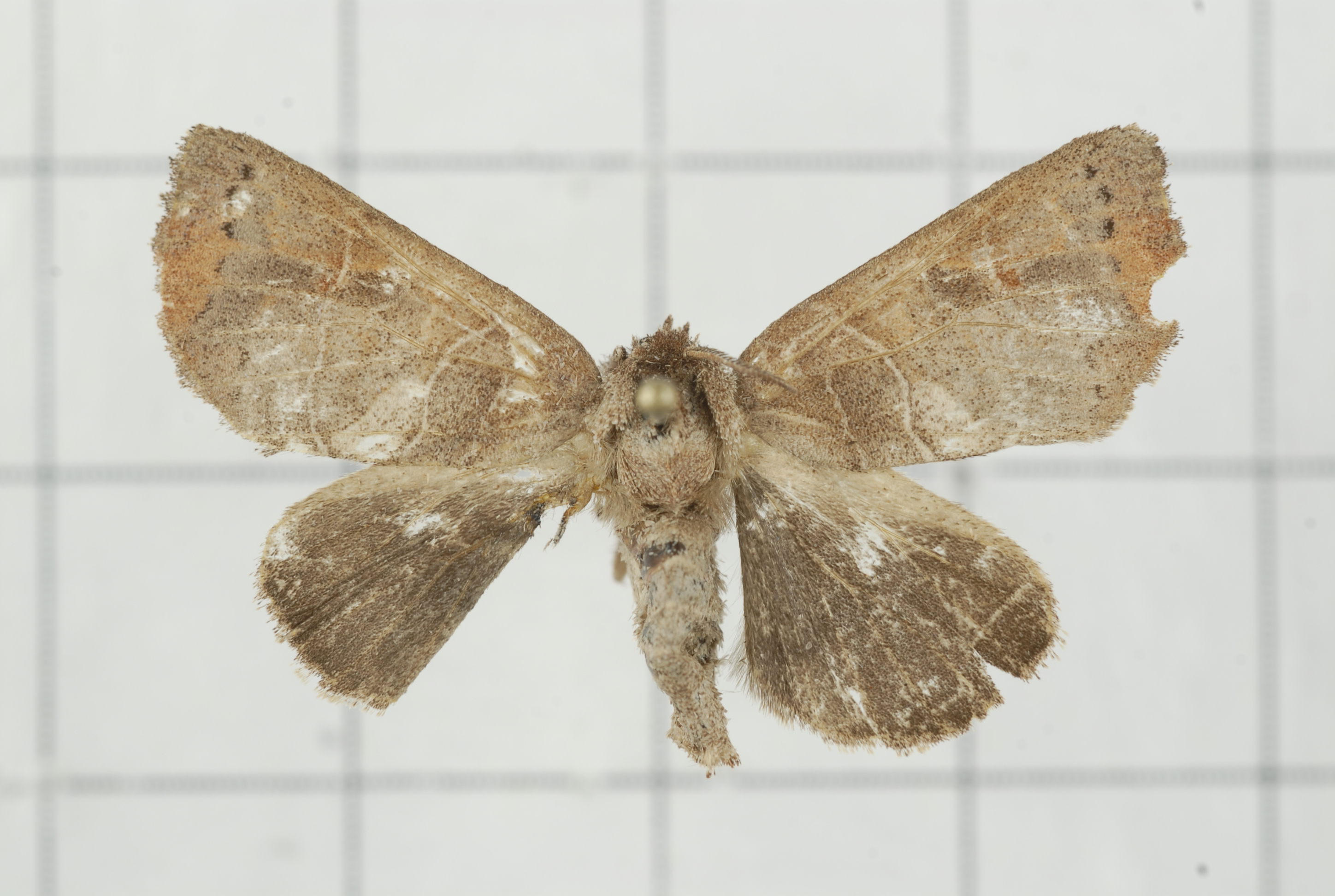

Scientific classification
- Kingdom: Animalia
- Phylum: Arthropoda
- Class: Insecta
- Order: Lepidoptera
- Superfamily: Noctuoidea
- Family: Notodontidae
- Genus: Clostera
- Species: C. restitura

Binomial name
- Clostera restitura (Walker, 1865)

Synonyms
- Ichthyura restitura Walker, 1865

= Clostera restitura =

Species of moth

Clostera restitura is a moth of the family Notodontidae first described by Francis Walker in 1865. It is found in Oriental tropics of India, Sri Lanka, and from Hong Kong to Sundaland.

== Biology ==
Forewings brown with slightly darker shading and fine, paler fasciae. Eggs pale green spherical with three broad, rich brown bands. Caterpillar reddish with a fine dorsal red line. This dorsal line is edged by broad, mottled, whitish bands. Head and tubercle processes black. Dorsal processes bifid, with a central orange patch. Early instars are gregarious, whereas late instars are not. Mature instar larva is grey with paler grey and rufous scribbling all over. Head greyish. Dorsal white dots appear. Pupation is in a loose silken cocoon spun between leaves. Larval stage extends to 11 days with four instars and pupal stage to more than a week. Overall metamorphosis cycle takes about 25 days.

Host plants of the caterpillar include Populus, Salix, Flacourtia, Casearia, Elaeocarpus and Terminalia species.

== Gallery ==
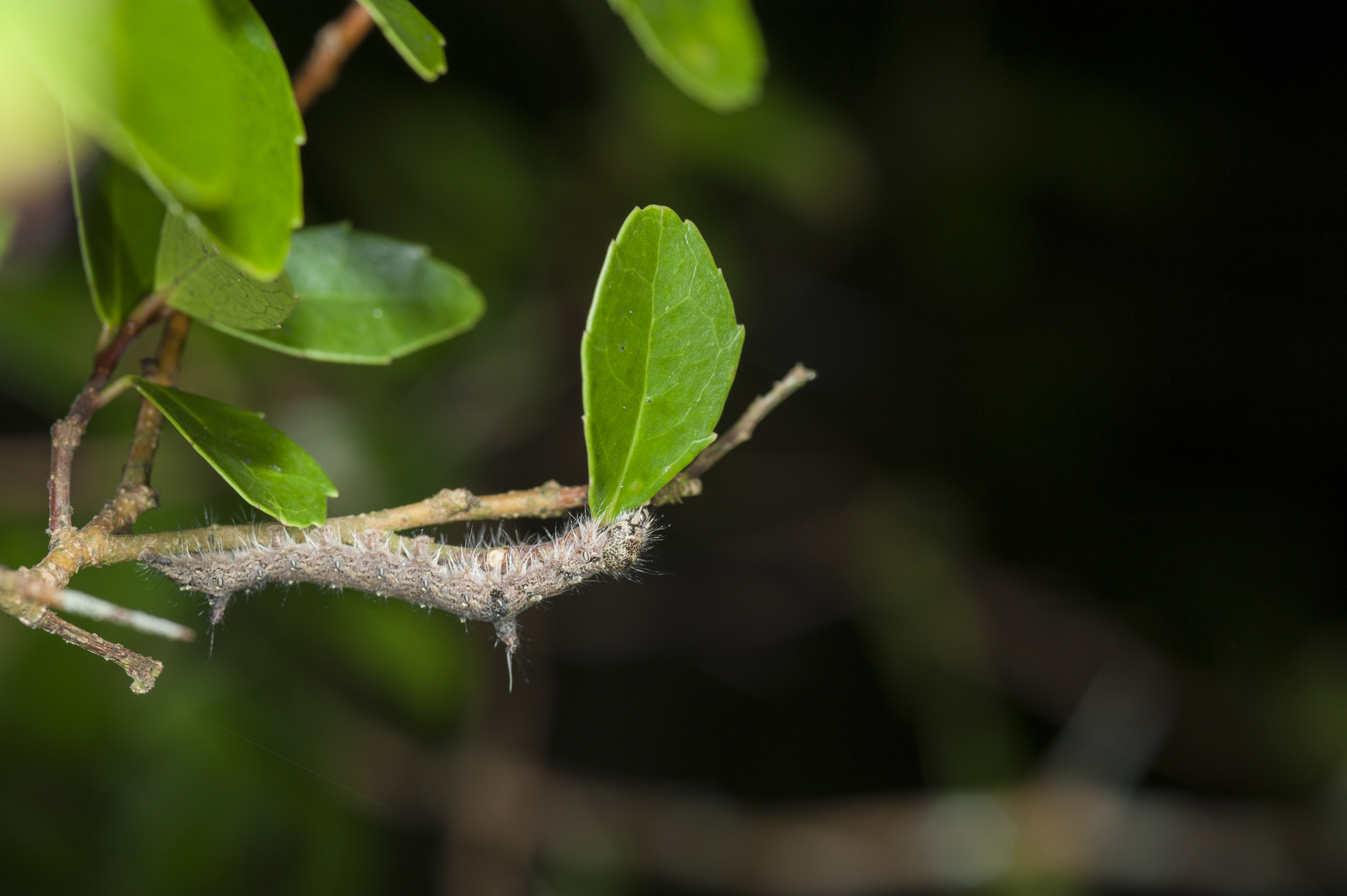
Caterpillar

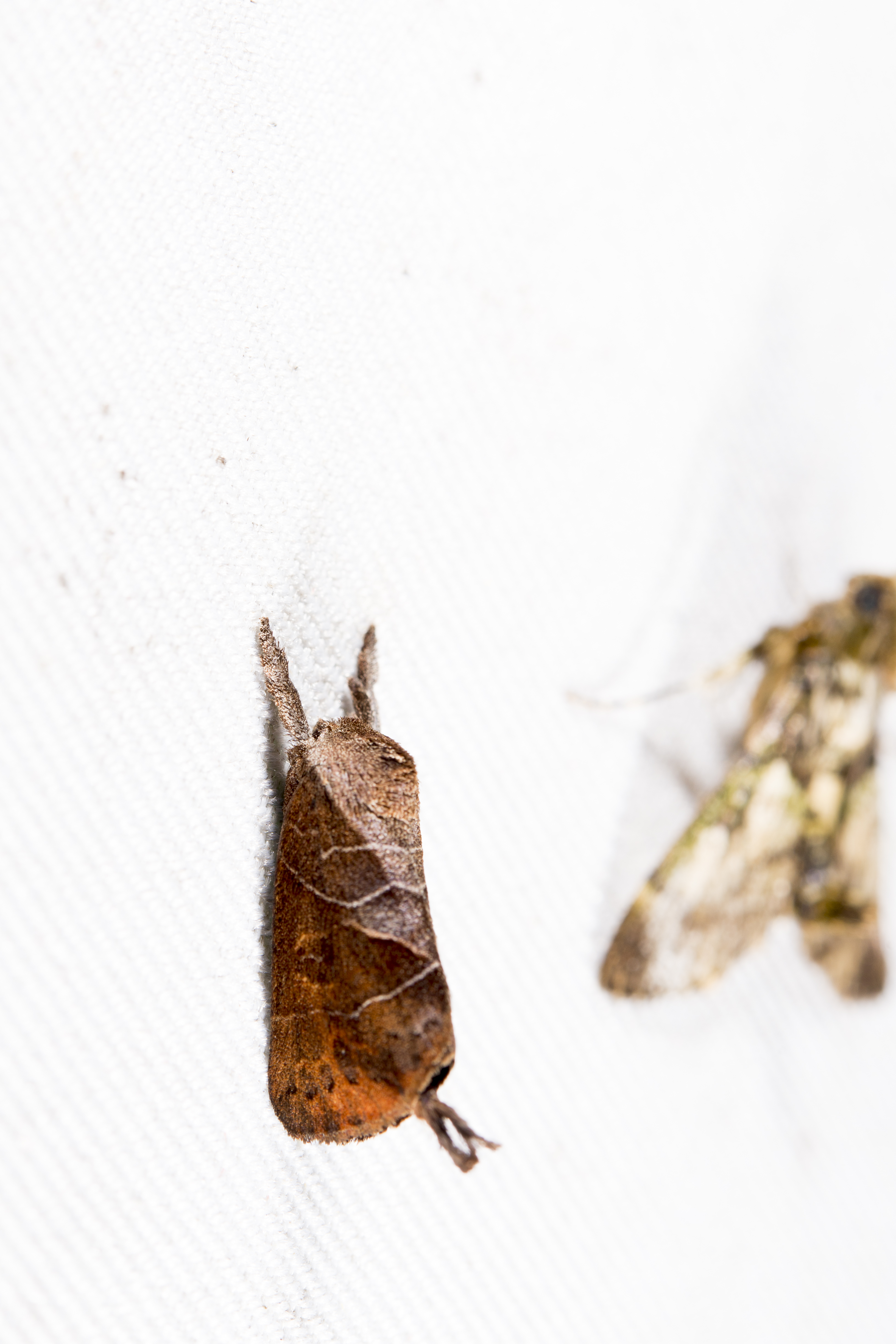

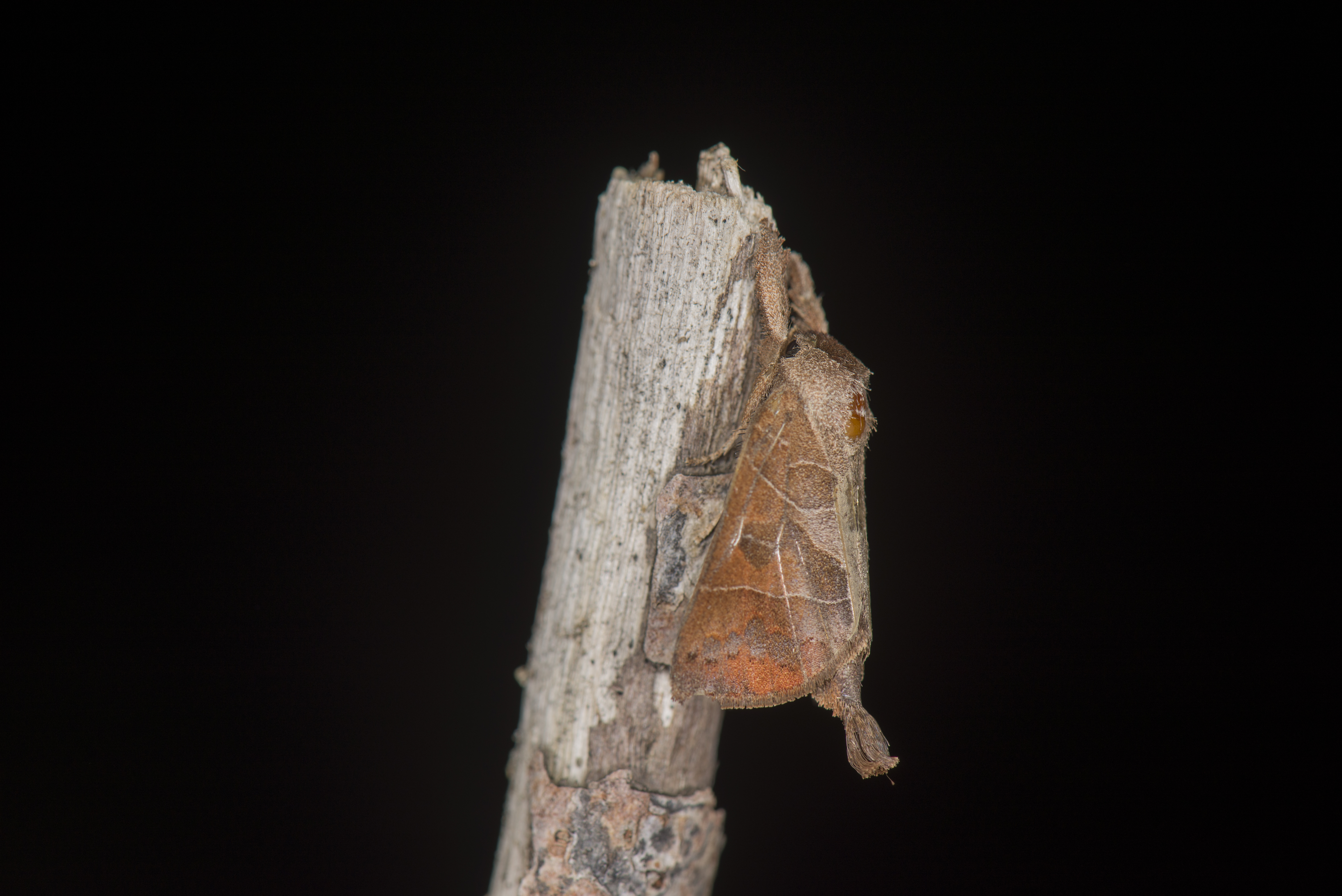
