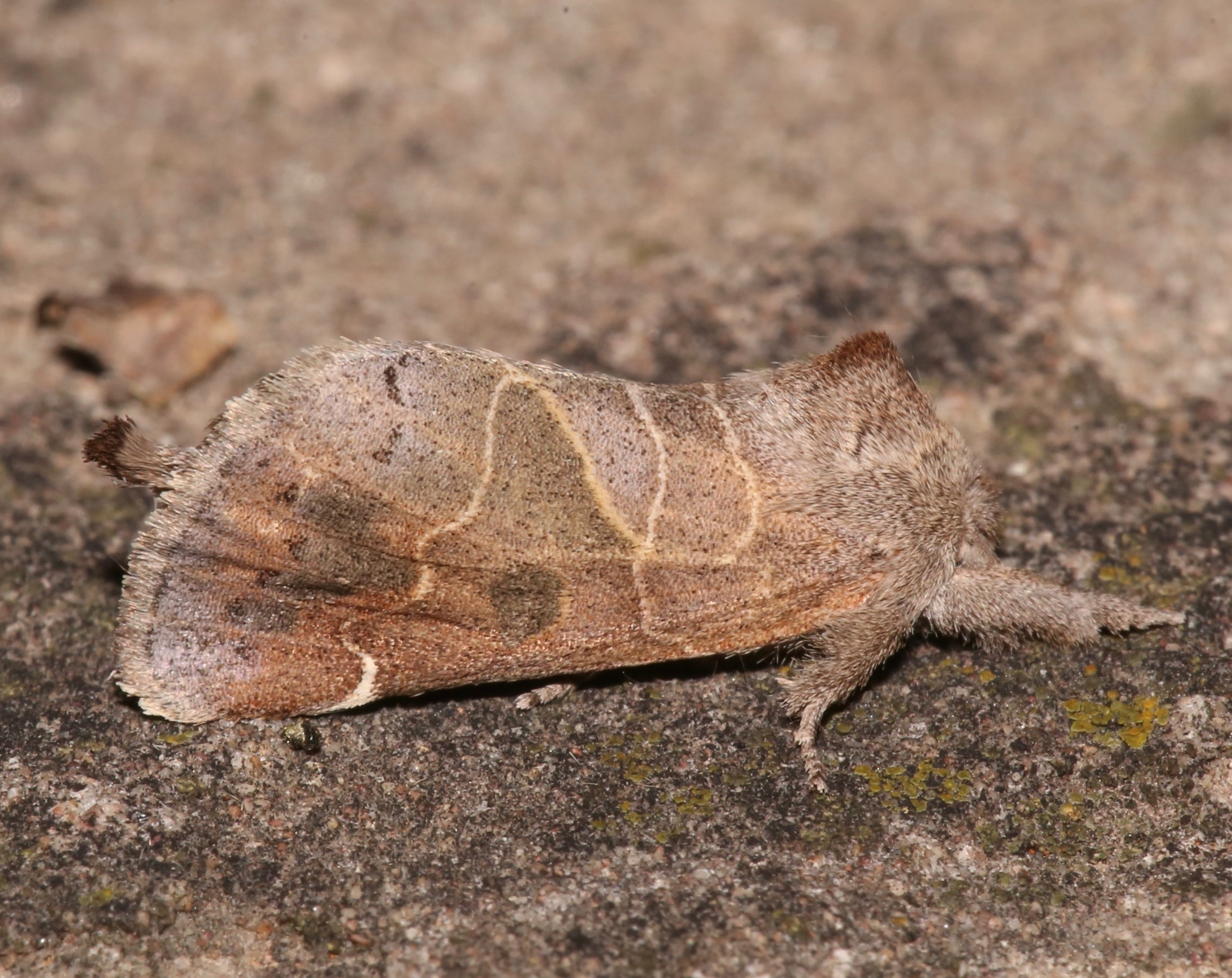

Scientific classification
- Domain: Eukaryota
- Kingdom: Animalia
- Phylum: Arthropoda
- Class: Insecta
- Order: Lepidoptera
- Superfamily: Noctuoidea
- Family: Notodontidae
- Genus: Clostera
- Species: C. inornata

Binomial name
- Clostera inornata (Neumoegen, 1882)

= Clostera inornata =

Species of moth

Clostera inornata is a species of moth in the family Notodontidae (the prominents). It was first described by Berthold Neumoegen in 1882 and it is found in North America.

The MONA or Hodges number for Clostera inornata is 7897.
