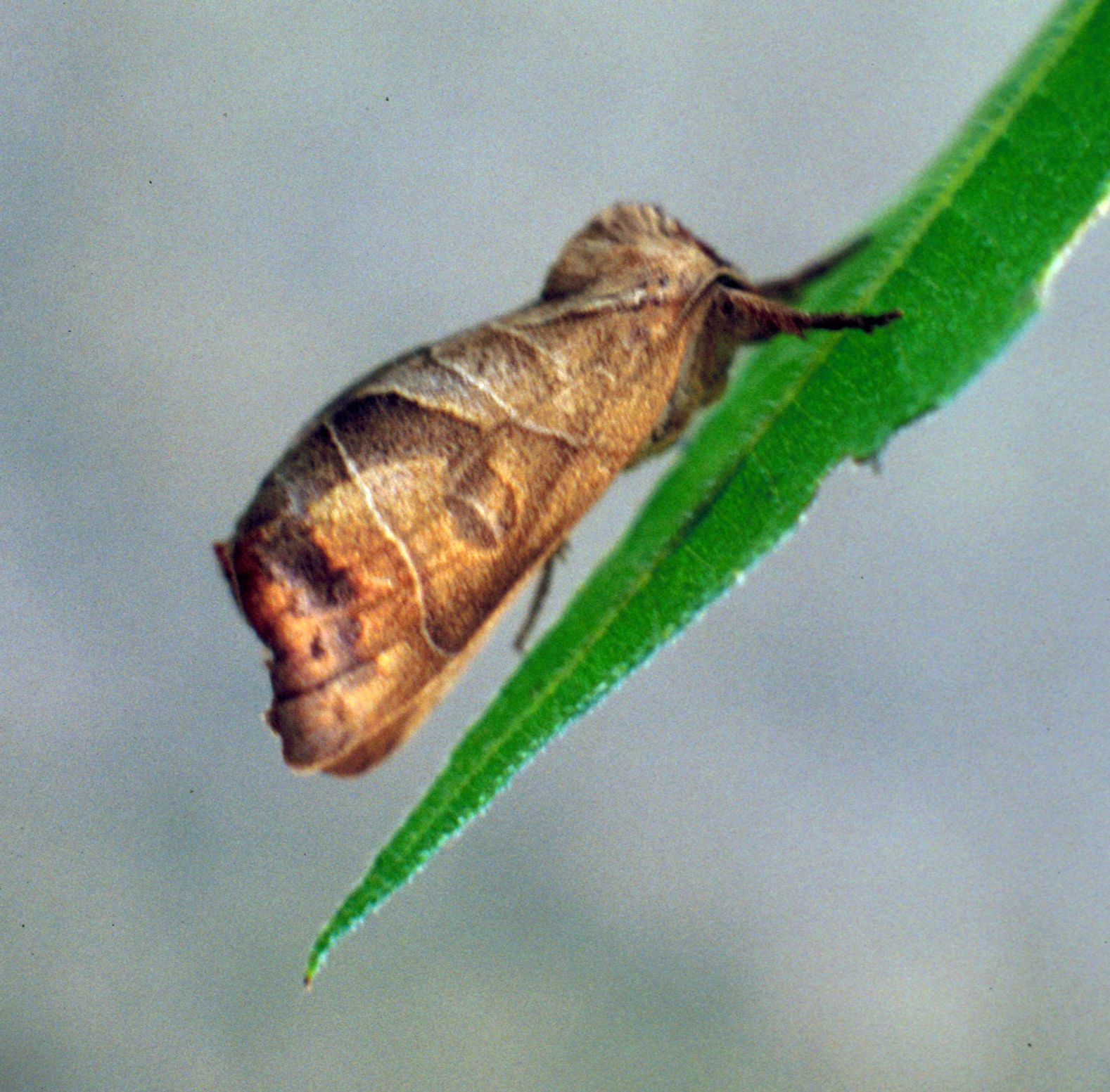

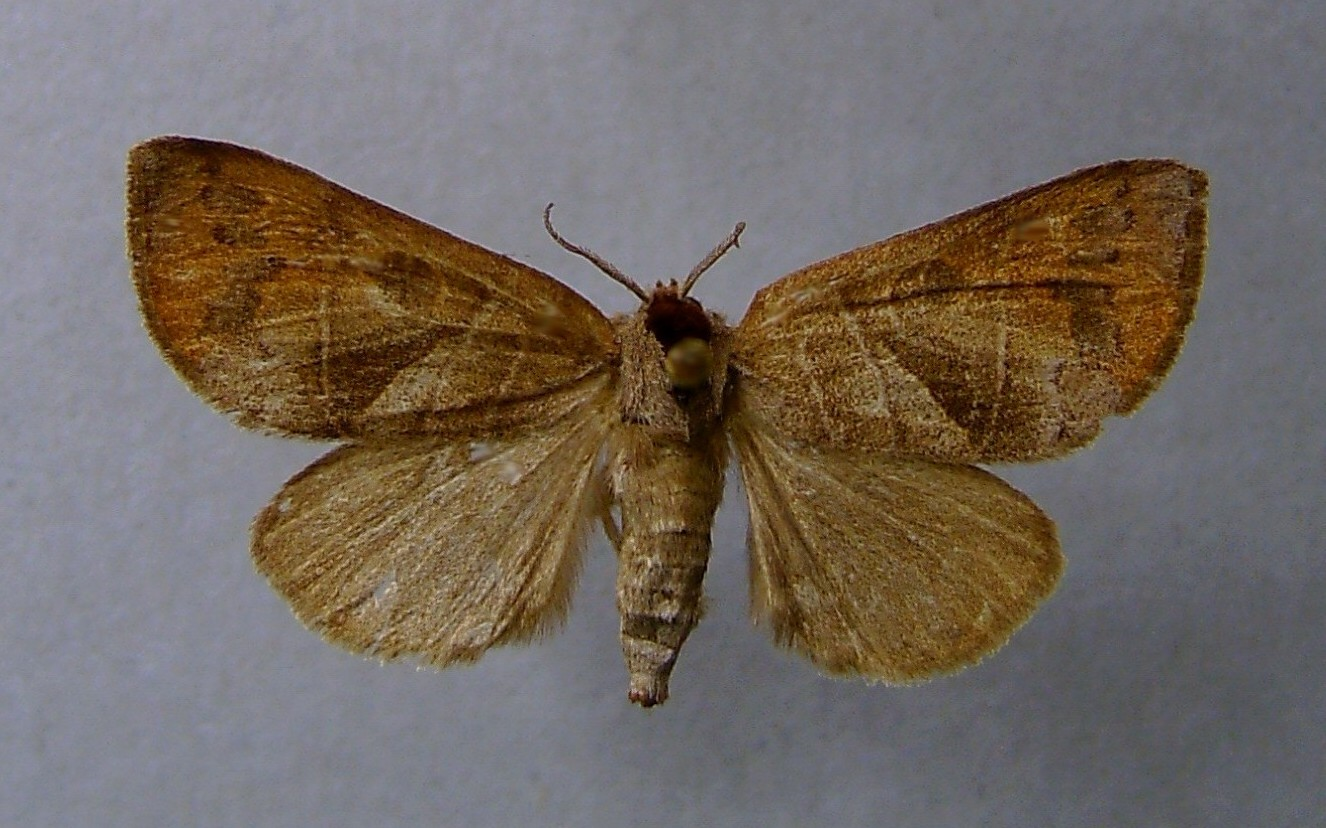

Scientific classification
- Kingdom: Animalia
- Phylum: Arthropoda
- Class: Insecta
- Order: Lepidoptera
- Superfamily: Noctuoidea
- Family: Notodontidae
- Genus: Clostera
- Species: C. anastomosis

Binomial name
- Clostera anastomosis (Linnaeus, 1758)

= Clostera anastomosis =

Species of moth

Clostera anastomosis is a moth of the family Notodontidae. It is found in the Palearctic realm.

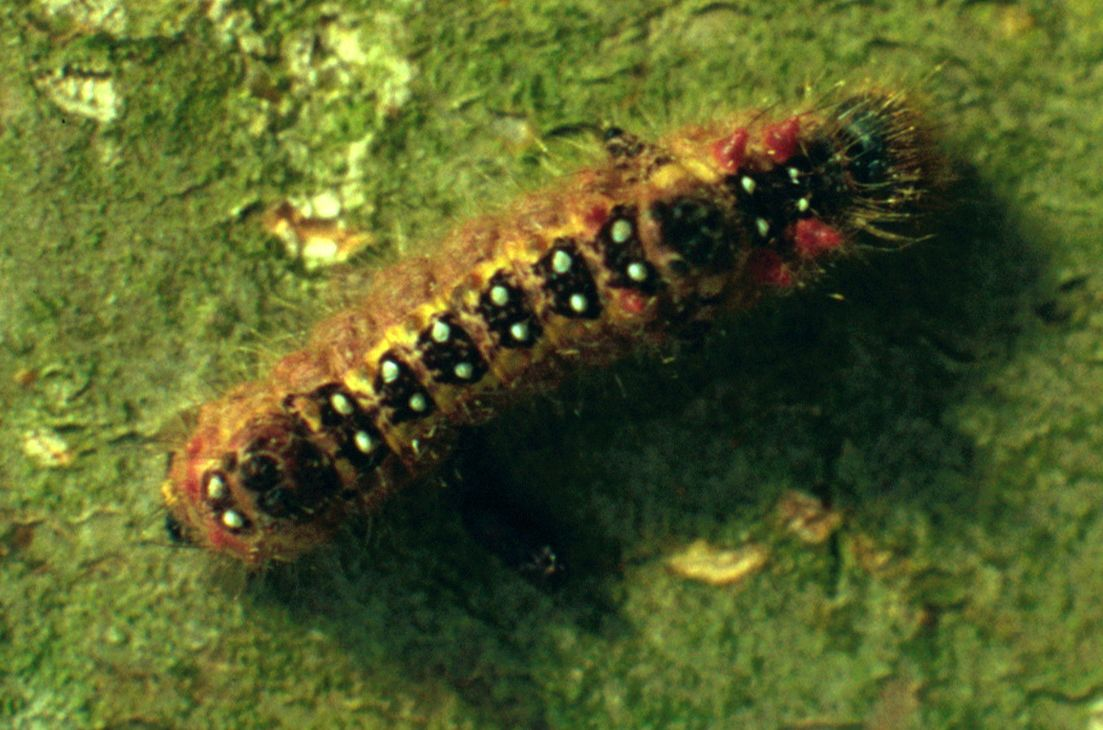
Caterpillar

The wingspan is 30–40 mm.

The larvae feed on willow and poplar.
