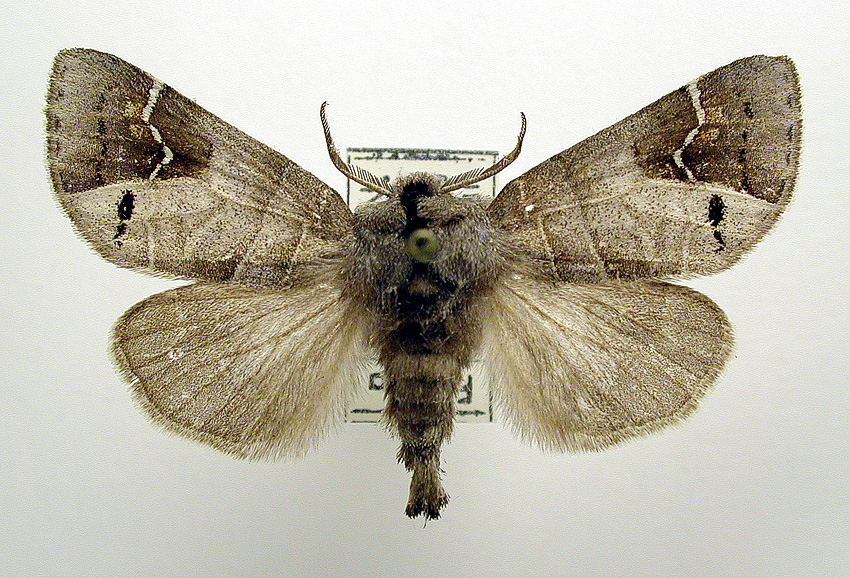

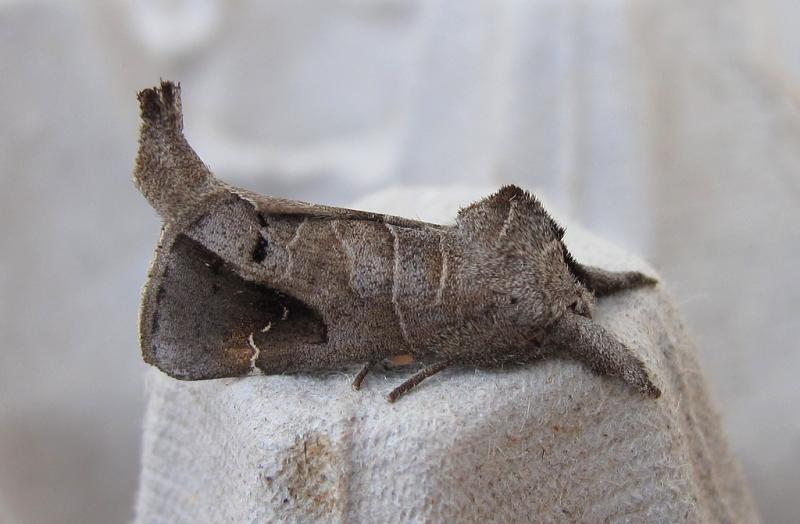

Scientific classification
- Domain: Eukaryota
- Kingdom: Animalia
- Phylum: Arthropoda
- Class: Insecta
- Order: Lepidoptera
- Superfamily: Noctuoidea
- Family: Notodontidae
- Genus: Clostera
- Species: C. anachoreta

Binomial name
- Clostera anachoreta (Denis & Schiffermüller, 1775)

= Clostera anachoreta =

Scarce chocolate-tip

Species of moth

Clostera anachoreta, the scarce chocolate-tip, is a moth of the family Notodontidae. The species was first described by Michael Denis and Ignaz Schiffermüller in 1775. It is found from Europe up to Japan and Korea.

The wingspan is about 37 mm. The moth flies from April to August in two generations depending on the location.

The larvae feed on Populus and Salix species.

== Gallery ==
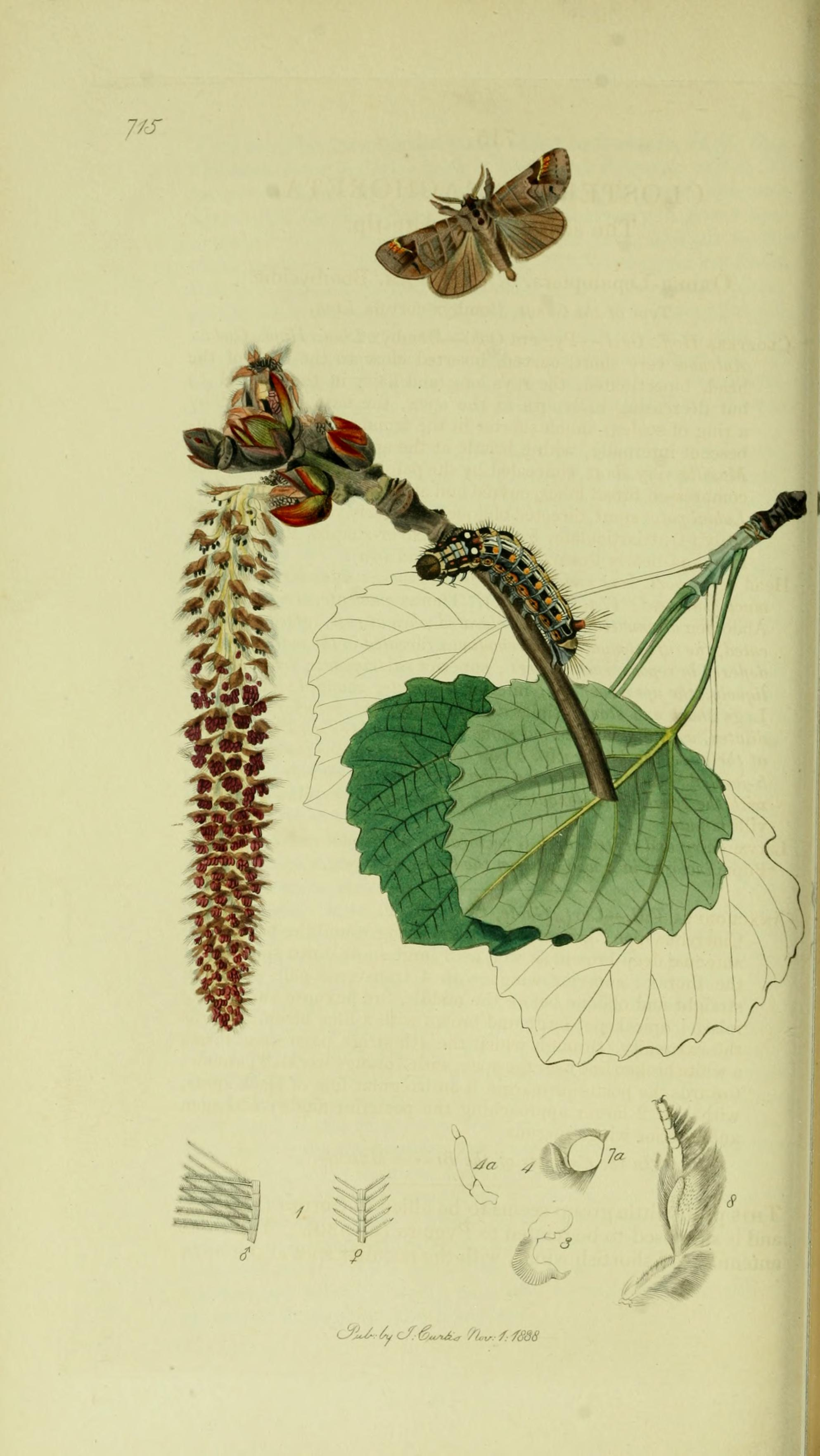
Illustration from John Curtis's British Entomology Volume 5

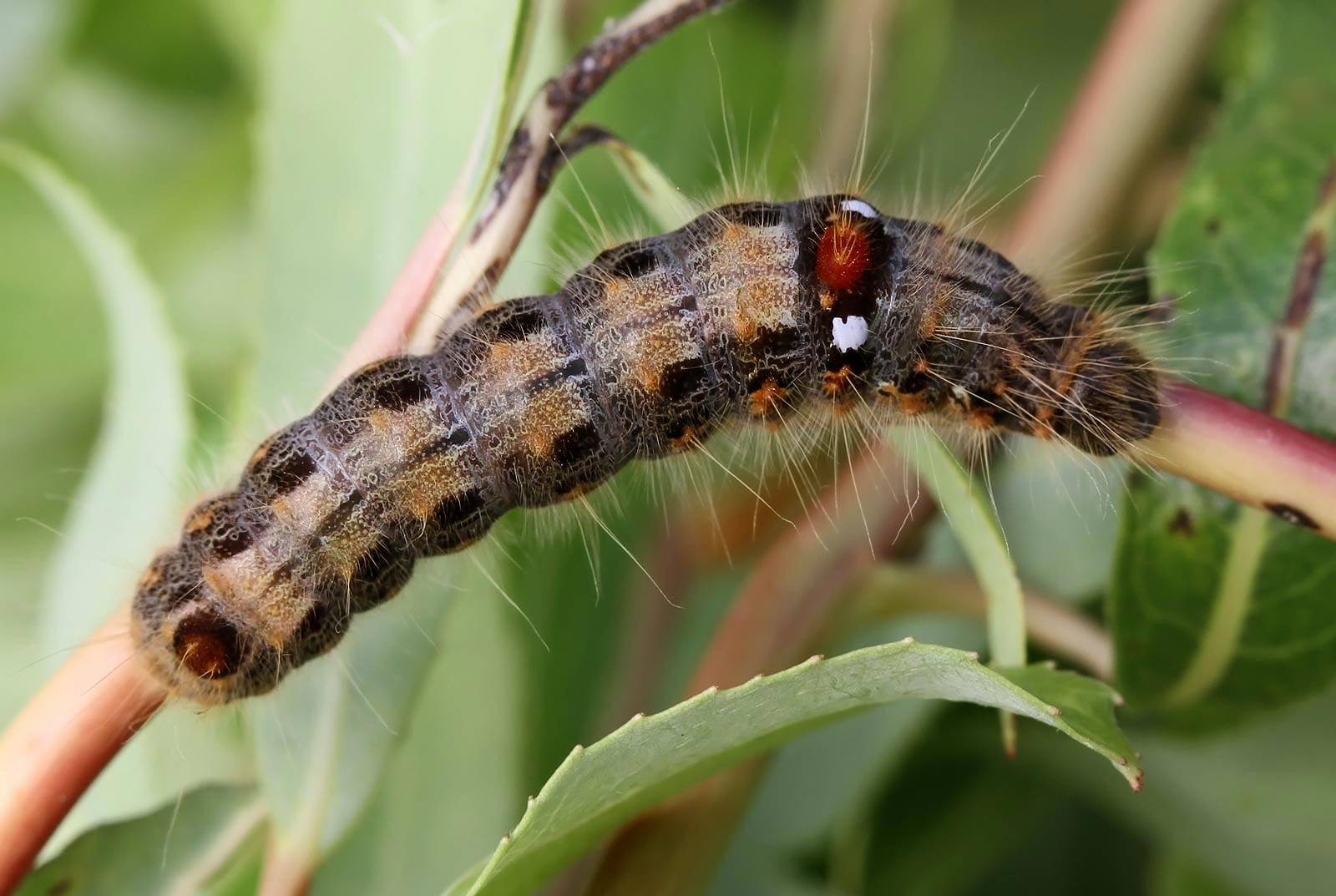
Larva

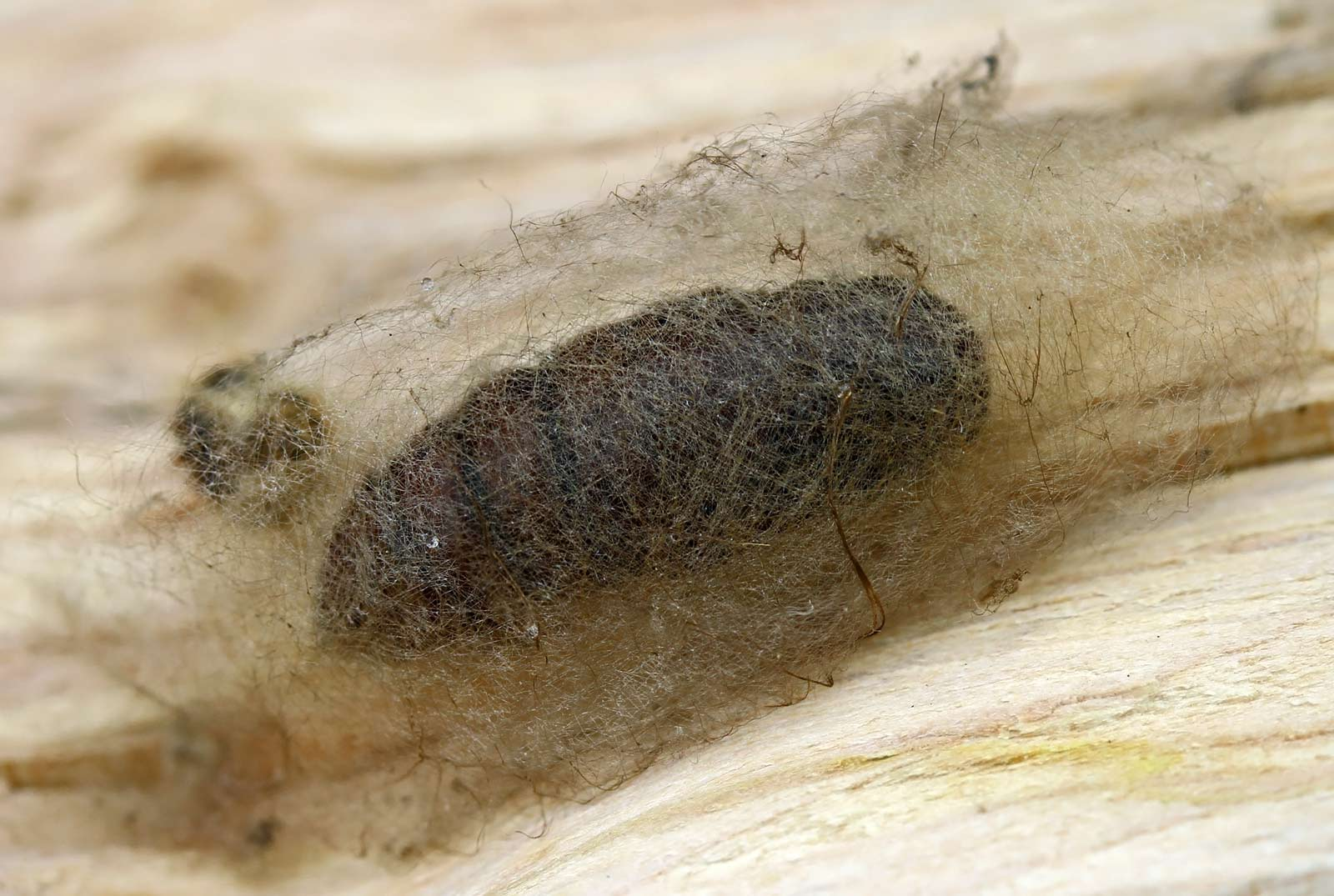
Pupa

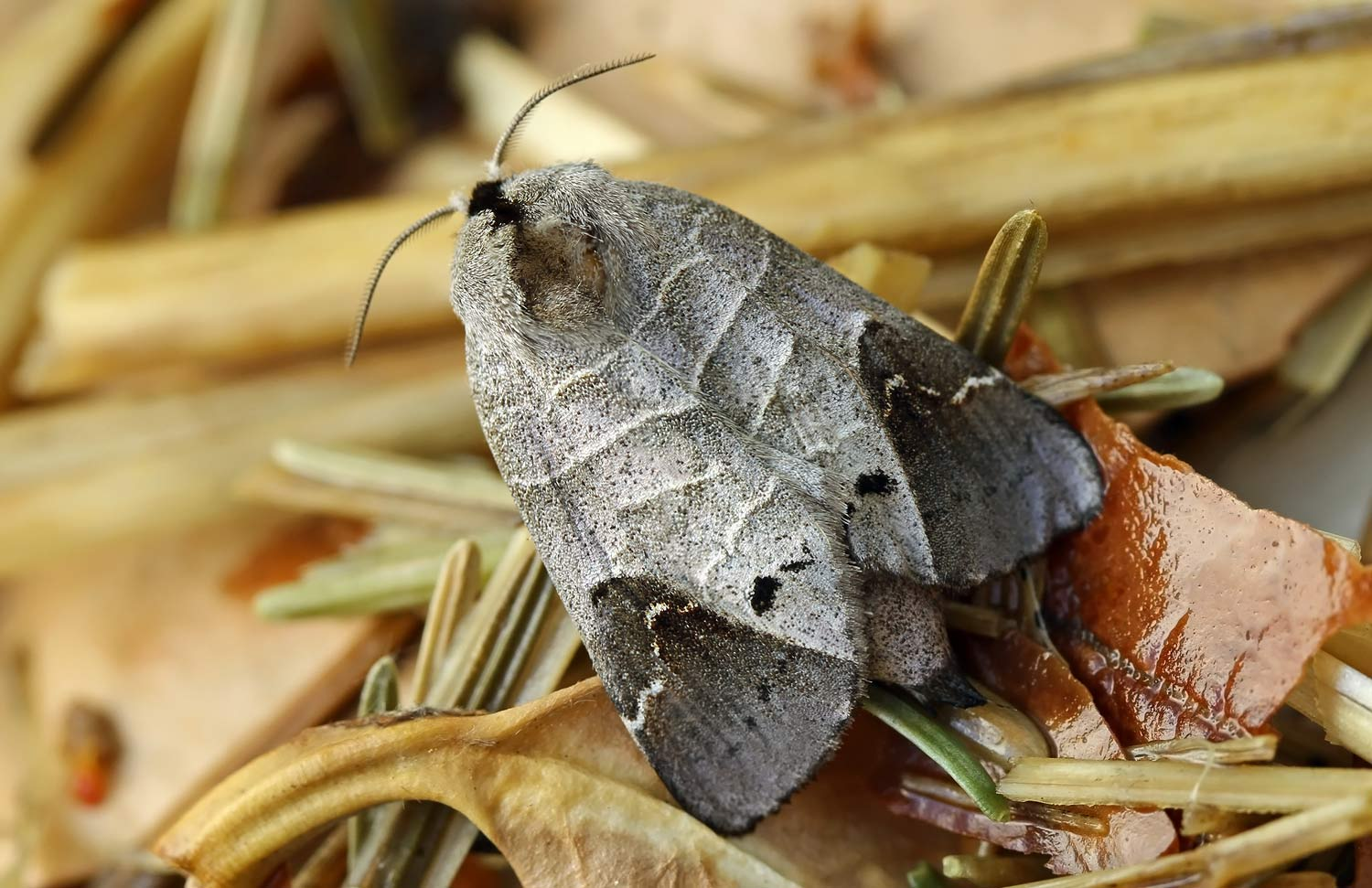
Adult

== Sources ==
- P.C.-Rougeot, P. Viette (1978). Guide des papillons nocturnes d'Europe et d'Afrique du Nord. Delachaux et Niestlé (Lausanne).
