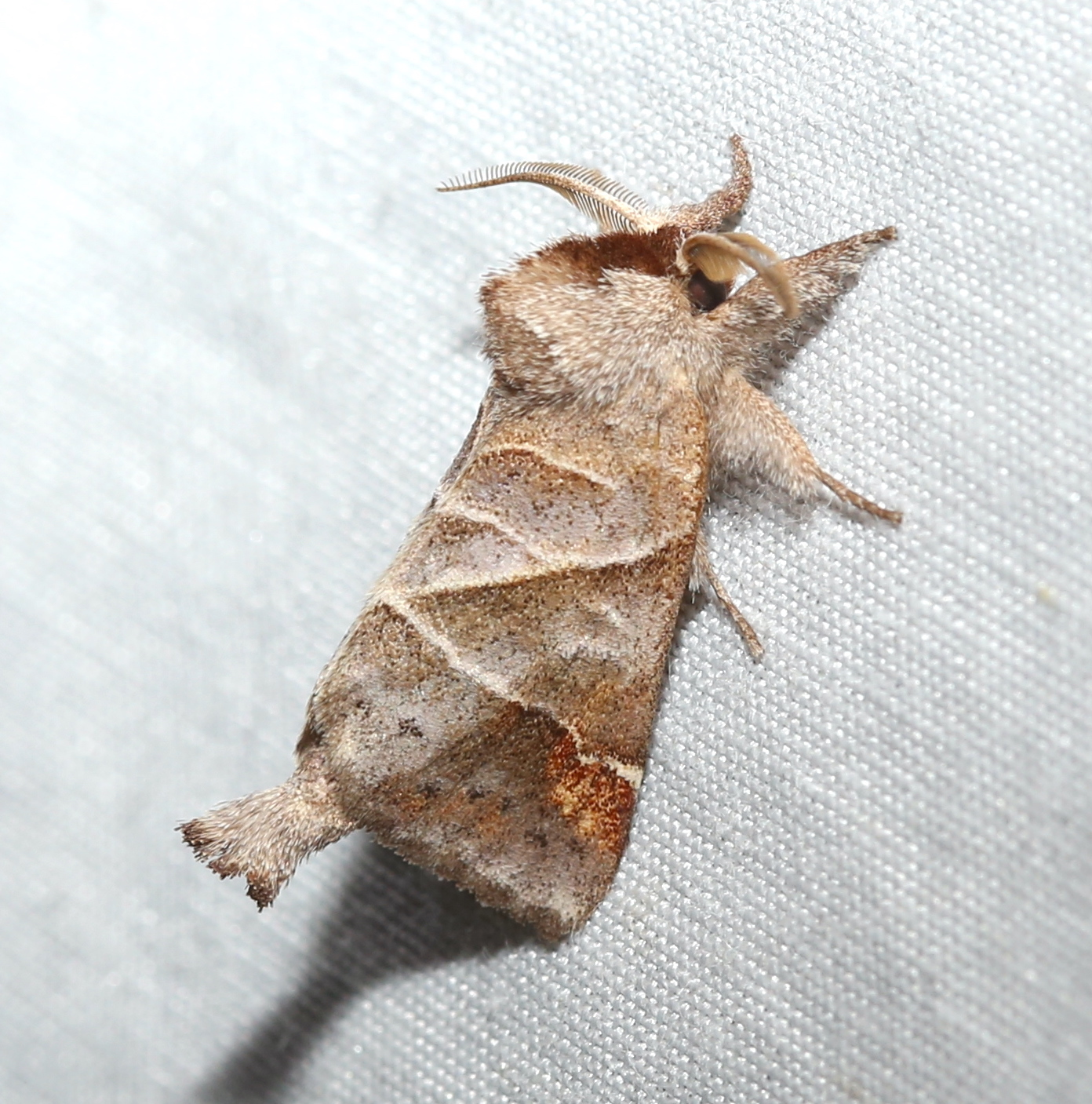

Scientific classification
- Kingdom: Animalia
- Phylum: Arthropoda
- Clade: Pancrustacea
- Class: Insecta
- Order: Lepidoptera
- Superfamily: Noctuoidea
- Family: Notodontidae
- Genus: Clostera
- Species: C. inclusa

Binomial name
- Clostera inclusa (Hübner, 1831)

Synonyms
- Ichthyura inclusa Hübner, 1831; Clostera americana Harris, 1841; Ichthyura inversa Packard, 1864; Melalopha palla French, 1882; Ichthyura jocosa Edwards, 1886

= Clostera inclusa =

Species of moth

Clostera inclusa, the angle-lined prominent moth, many-lined prominent or poplar tentmaker, is a moth of the family Notodontidae. The species was first described by Jacob Hübner in 1831. It is found in North America, including Arkansas, Colorado, Florida, Georgia, Illinois, New Hampshire, New York, North Carolina, Oklahoma, Ontario, Oregon, Pennsylvania, South Carolina and Virginia.

The wingspan is 25–32 mm.

The larvae feed on various Salicaceae species. They are gregarious.

== Gallery ==
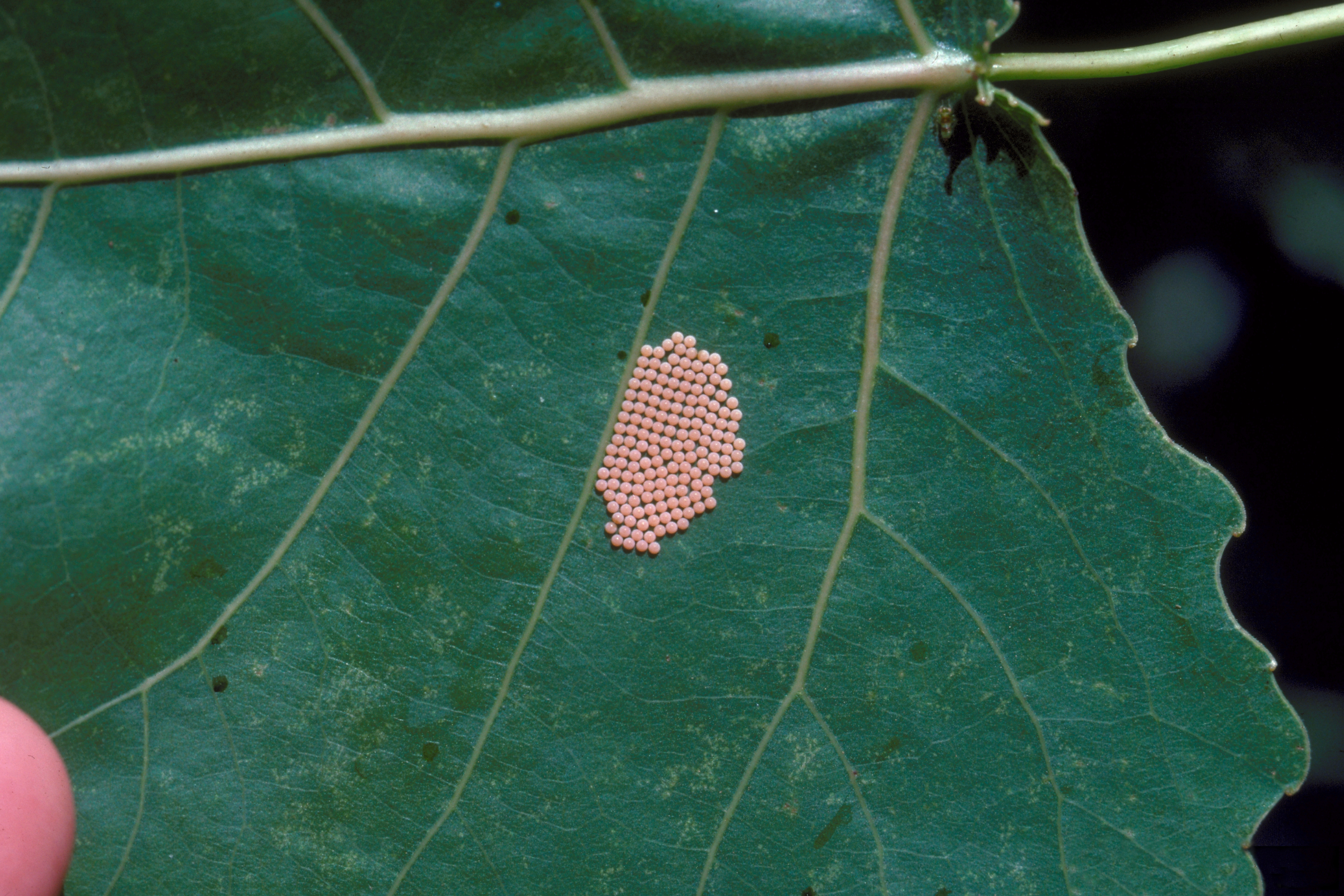
Eggs

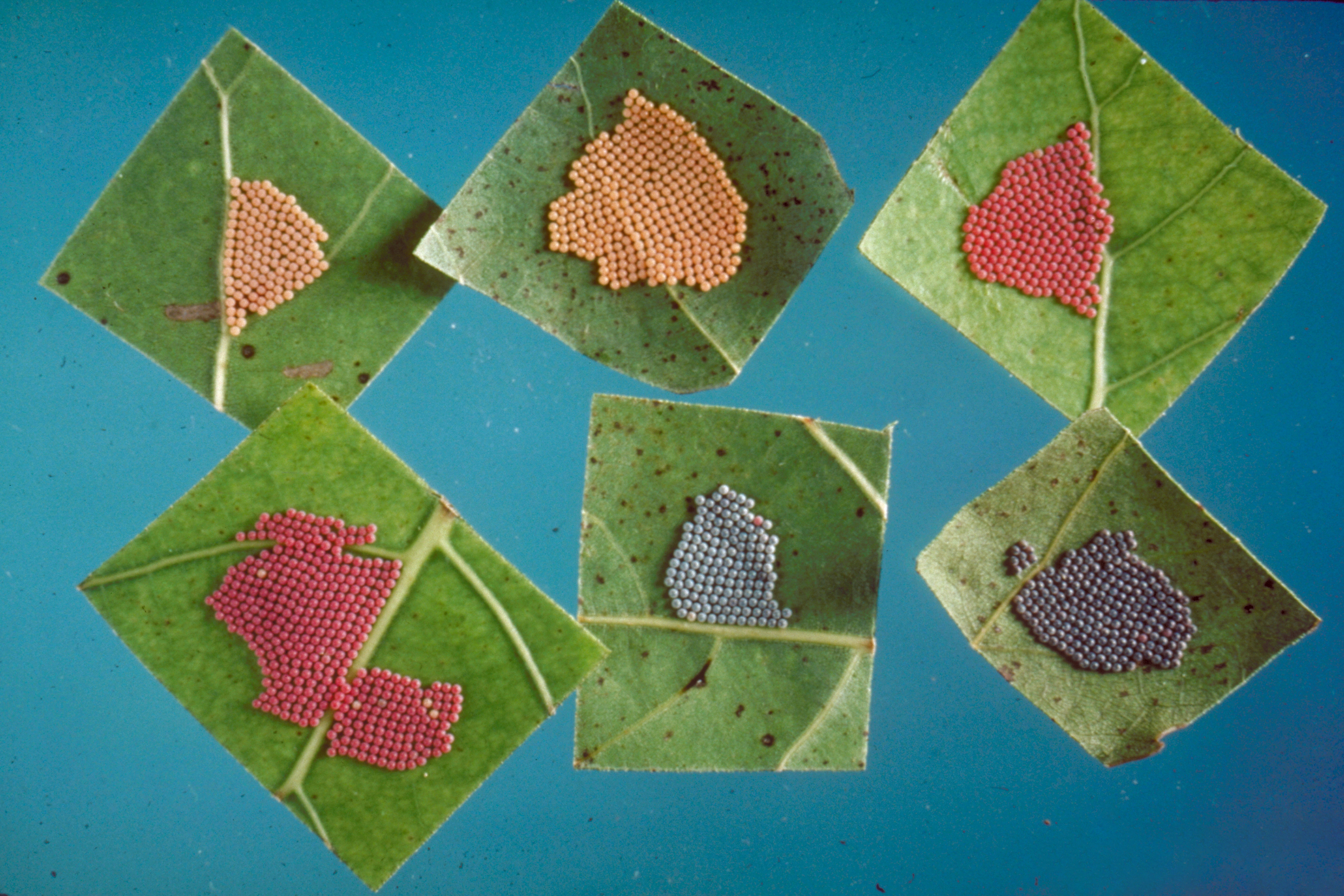
Eggs

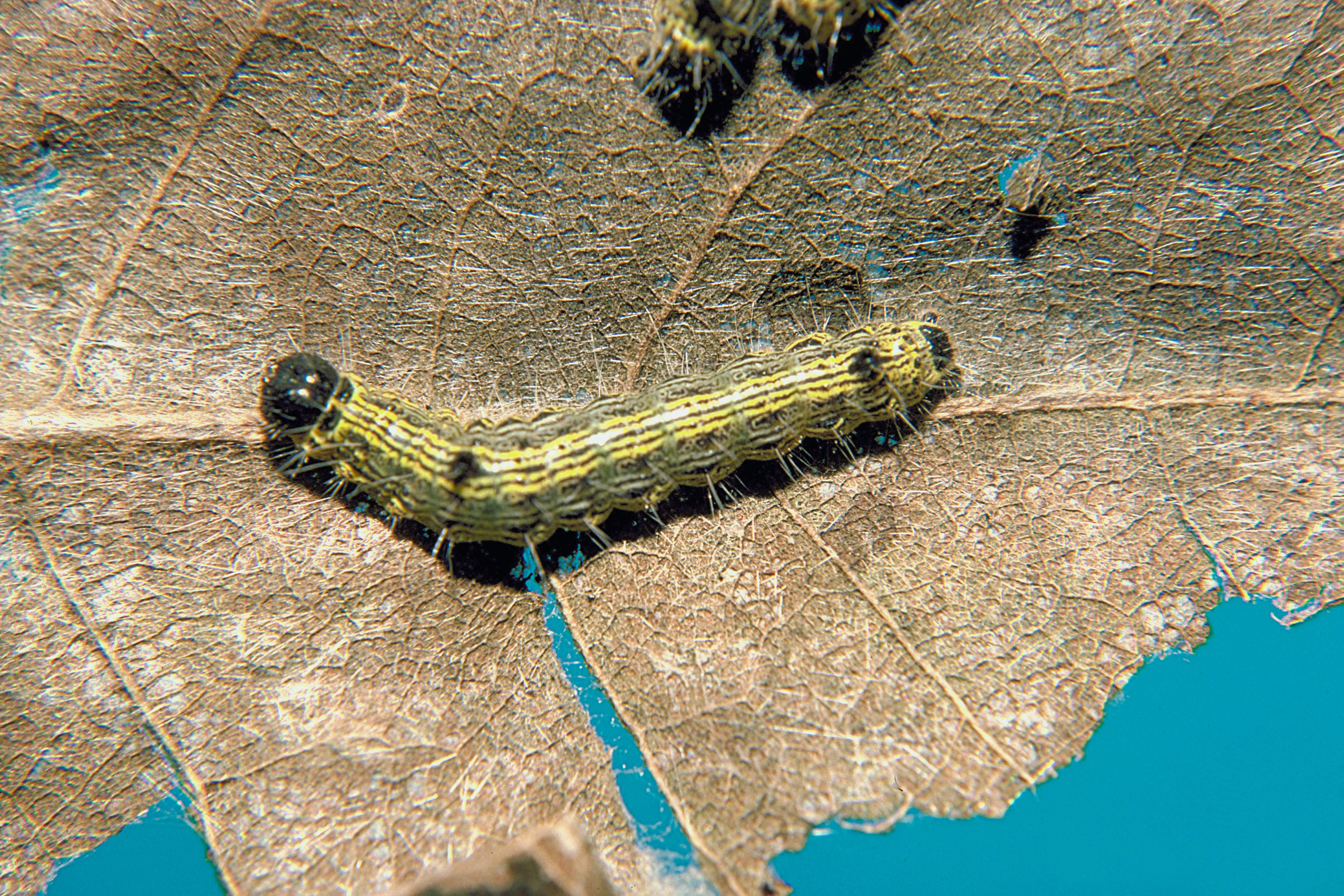
Larva

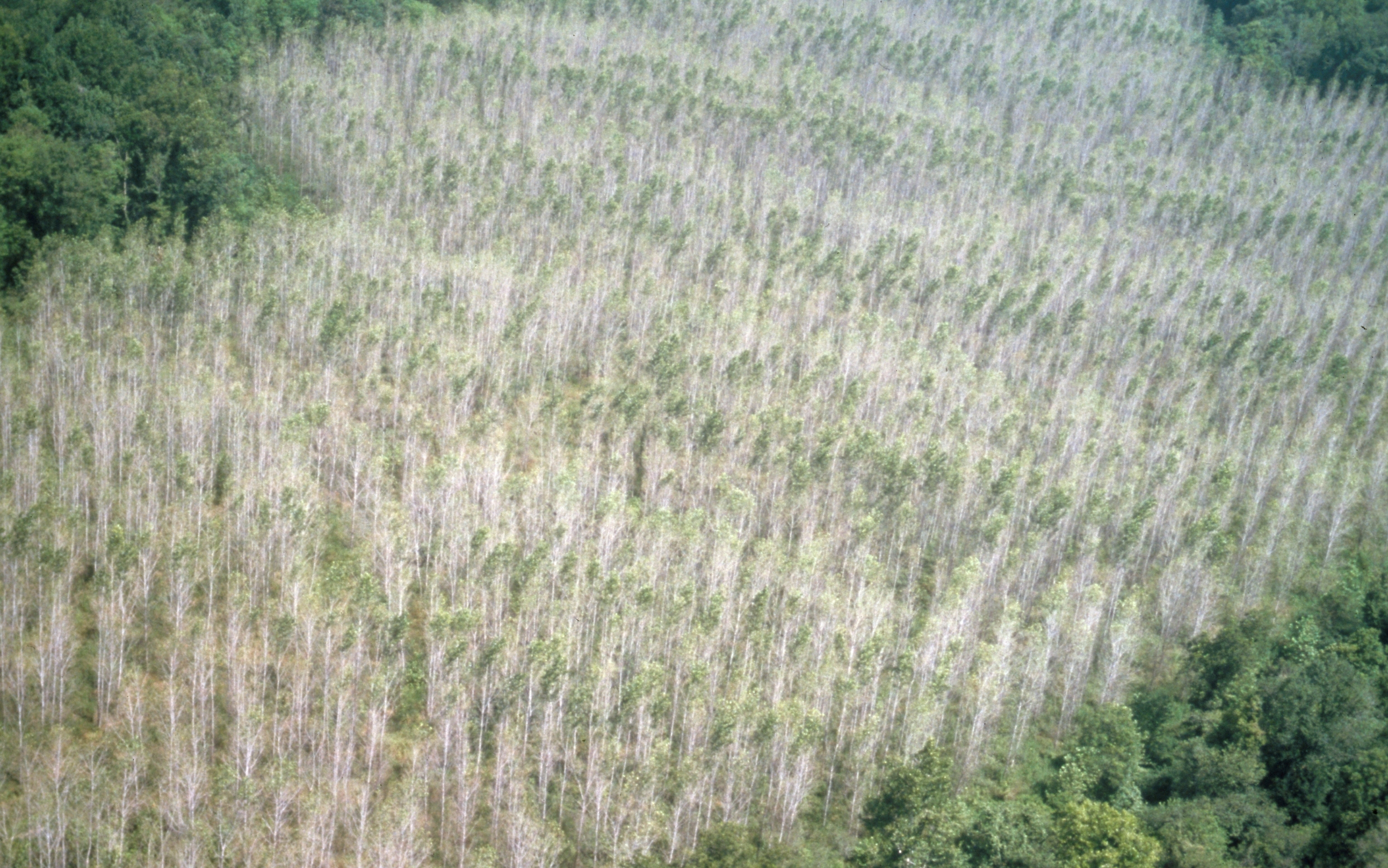
Damage

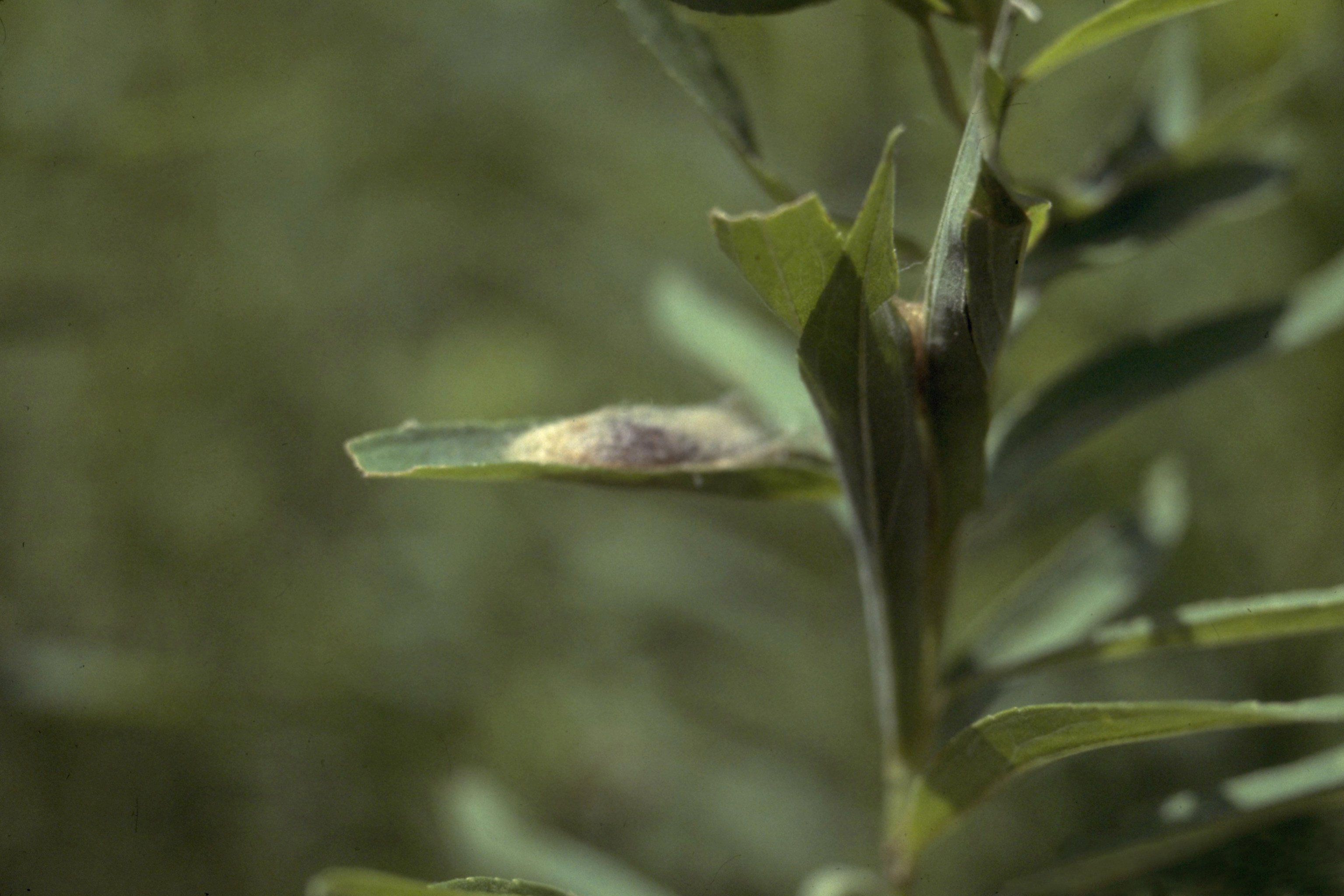
Cocoon

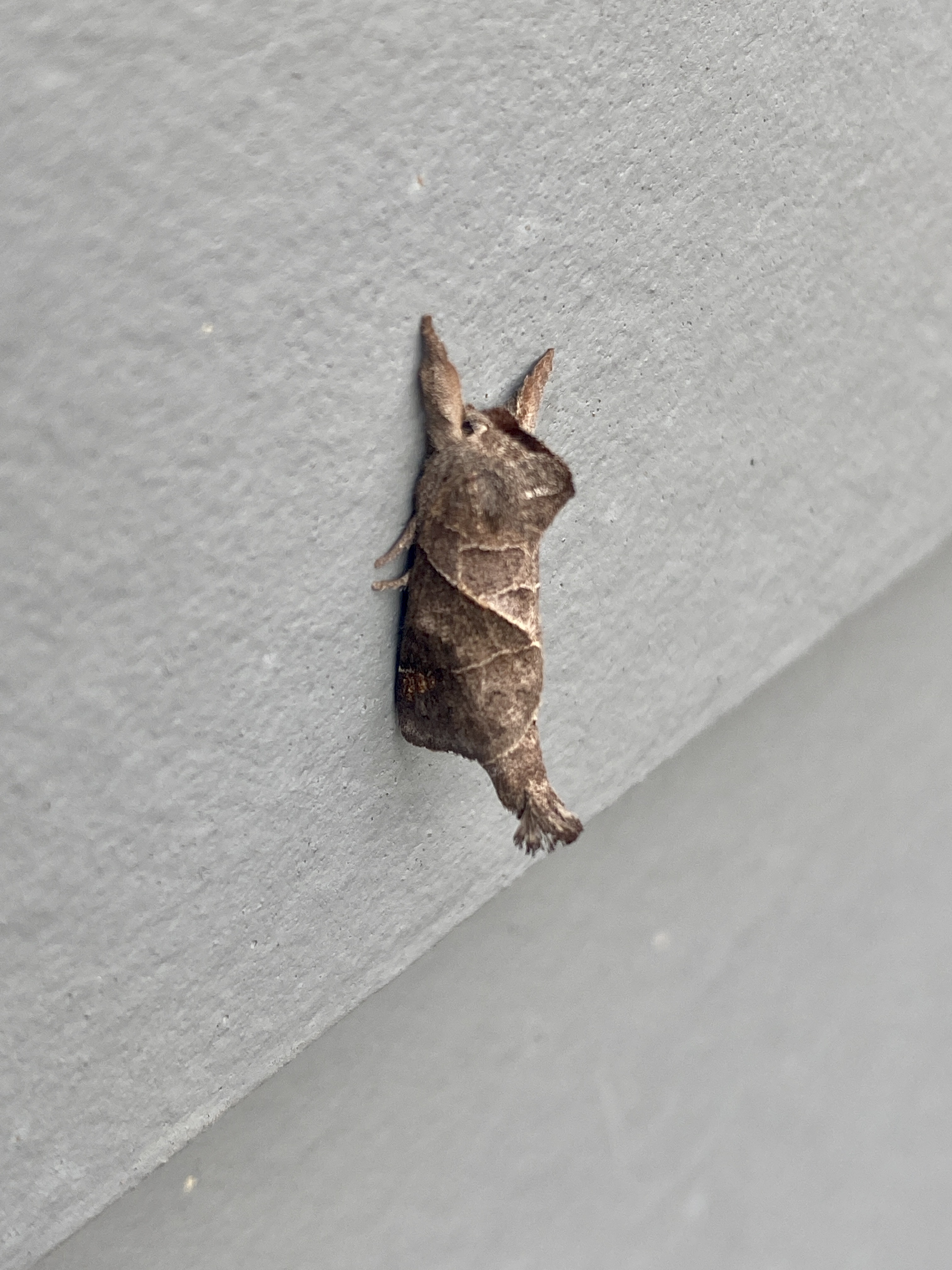
Adult
