= List of moths of India (Notodontidae) =

This is a list of moths of the family Notodontidae that are found in India. It also acts as an index to the species articles and forms part of the full List of moths of India.

== Genus Antheua ==
- Antheua servula Drury
- Antheua exanthemata Moore

== Genus Anticyra ==
- Anticyra combusta Walker

== Genus Apela ==
- Apela divisa Walker

== Genus Baradesaj ==
- Baradesaj lithosioides Moore

== Genus Besaia ==
- Besaia rubiginea Walker

== Genus Cerura ==
- Cerura liturata Walker
- Cerura wisei Swinhoe
- Cerura prasana Moore

== Genus Chadisra ==
- Chadisra bipni-s Walker

== Genus Cyphanta ==
- Cyphanta xanthochlora Walker
- Cyphanta chortochlora Hampson

== Genus Dicranura ==
- Dicranura himalayana Moore
- Dicranura roestleri de Lattin, et al.

== Genus Dudusa ==
- Dudusa sphingiformis Moore

== Genus Euhampsonia ==
- Euhampsonia niveiceps (Walker, 1865)

== Genus Fentonia ==
- Fentonia argentifera Moore
- Fentonia brunnea Moore
- Fentonia obliquiplaga Moore
- Fentonia ocypete Brem
- Fentonia tenebrosa Walker

== Genus Gangarides ==
- Gangarides dharma Moore, 1865
- Gangarides rosea Walker

== Genus Gargetta ==
- Gargetta costigera Walker
- Gargetta nagaensis Hampson
- Gargetta curvaria Hampson
- Gargetta ingens Walker
- Gargetta albimacula Hampson

== Genus Gazalina ==
- Gazalina apsara (Moore, 1859)
- Gazalina transversa (Moore, 1879)

== Genus Ginshachia ==
- Ginshachia gemmifera (Moore, 1877)

== Genus Hapigia ==
- Hapigia obliqua Walker

== Genus Harpyia ==
- Harpyia longipennis Walker
- Harpyia microsticta Hampson

== Genus Hyperaeschra ==
- Hyperaeschra pallida Butler, 1880
- Hyperaeschra basistriga Moore
- Hyperaeschra tenebrosa Moore
- Hyperaeschra basalis Moore
- Hyperaeschra nigribasis Hampson
- Hyperaeschra dentata Hampson
- Hyperaeschra variegata Moore

== Genus Ichthyura ==
- Ichthyura anachoreta Fabricius
- Ichthyura pallida Walker
- Ichthyura costicomma Hampson
- Ichthyura cupreata Butler
- Ichthyura restitura Walker
- Ichthyura undulata Hampson
- Ichthyura ferruginea Moore

== Genus Liparopsis ==
- Liparopsis postalbida Hampson

== Genus Lophopteryx ==
- Lophopteryx saturata Walker
- Lophopteryx atrofusa Hampson
- Lophopteryx flavistigma Moore
- Lophopteryx ferruginosa Moore

== Genus Megaceramis ==
- Megaceramis lamprolepis Hampson

== Genus Metasrhsilis ==
- Metasrhsilis disrupta Moore

== Genus Neodrymonia ==
- Neodrymonia apicalis (Moore,1879)

== Genus Niganda ==
- Niganda strigifascia Moore, 1879

== Genus Norraca ==
- Norraca longipennis Moore

== Genus Notodonta ==
- Notodonta albifascia Moore
- Notodonta gigantea Elwes
- Notodonta moorei Hampson
- Notodonta sikkima Moore
- Notodonta rufa Hampson

== Genus Oleapa ==
- Oleapa latifascia Walker

== Genus Phalera ==
- Phalera parivala Moore
- Phalera sangana Moore
- Phalera torpida Walker
- Phalera procera Felder
- Phalera raya Moore
- Phalera grotei Moore, 1859
- Phalera torpida Walker, 1865

== Genus Pheosia ==
- Pheosia fasciata Moore
- Pheosia pulcherrima Moore
- Pheosia excurvata Hampson
- Pheosia sikkima Moore

== Genus Phycidopsis ==
- Phycidopsis albovittata Hampson, 1893

== Genus Pydna ==
- Pydna testacea Walker
- Pydna decurrens Moore
- Pydna longivitta Walker
- Pydna nana Swinhoe
- Pydna pallida Butler
- Pydna ochracea Moore
- Pydna galbana Stcinh
- Pydna metaphsea Walker
- Pydna eupatagia Hampson
- Pydna aurata Moore
- Pydna fasciata Moore
- Pydna sikkima Moore
- Pydna nigropimetfi Hampson
- Pydna nigrofasciata Hampson
- Pydna basistriga Moorec
- Pydna ferrifera Walker

== Genus Rachia ==
- Rachia plumosa Moore
- Rachia striata Hampson

== Genus Ramesa ==
- Ramesa tosta Walker, 1855
- Ramesa fuscipennis Hampson
- Ramesa divisa Moore
- Ramesa albistriga Moore

== Genus Somera ==
- Somera viridifusca Walker
- Somera virens Dierl

== Genus Spatalia ==
- Spatalia argentifera Walker
- Spatalia costalis Moore
- Spatalia argentata Moore
- Spatalia albifasciata Hampson
- Spatalia auritractata Moore
- Spatalia plusioides Moore

== Genus Stauropus ==
- Stauropus maculatus Moore
- Stauropus alternus Walker
- Stauropus sikkimensis Moore
- Stauropus dentilinea Hampson
- Stauropus apicalis Moore
- Stauropus viridescens Walker
- Stauropus pallidifascia Hampson
- Stauropus albivertex Hampson
- Stauropus fasciatus Moore
- Stauropus griseus Hampson
- Stauropus orliit
- Stauropus basiniger Moore
- Stauropus vinaceus Moore
- Stauropus plagiviridis Moore

== Genus Syntypistis ==
- Syntypistis umbrosa Matsumura, 1927

== Genus Tarsolepis ==
- Tarsolepis fulgurifera Walker
- Tarsolepis remicauda Butler: this is Tarsolepis sommeri Huebner see G.F. Hampson (1896) Fauna of British India Vol. 4, p. 453.

== Genus Teleclita ==
- Teleclita grisea (Swinhoe, 1892)
- Teleclita strigata (Moore 1879)

== Genus Turnaca ==
- Turnaca acuta Walker

== Genus Zana ==
- Zana lignosa Walker

== Genus Zaranga ==
- Zaranga pannosa Moore

== See also ==
- Notodontidae
- Moths
- Lepidoptera
- List of moths of India
