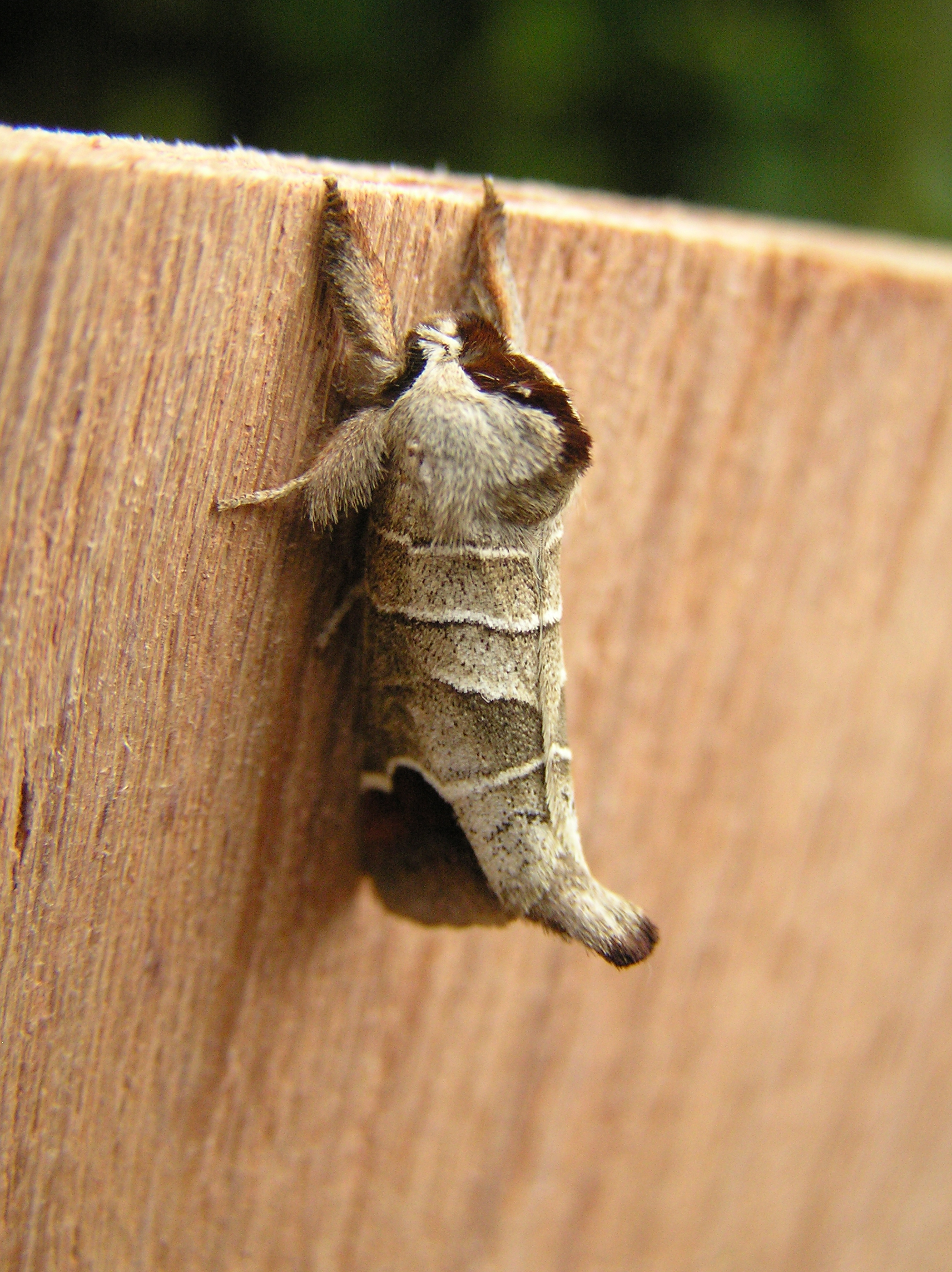
- Clostera curtula

Scientific classification
- Kingdom: Animalia
- Phylum: Arthropoda
- Clade: Pancrustacea
- Class: Insecta
- Order: Lepidoptera
- Superfamily: Noctuoidea
- Family: Notodontidae
- Subfamily: Pygaerinae

Genera
- Presently 13, see text

= Pygaerinae =

Subfamily of moths

Pygaerinae is a subfamily of the moth family Notodontidae, the silver prominents and relatives. The genus list is preliminary, as not all Notodontidae have been assigned to subfamilies yet.

== Genera ==
- Caschara
- Clostera
- Coscodaca
- Ginshachia
  - Ginshachia bronacha
  - Ginshachia gemmifera
- Gonoclostera
- Gluphisia
- Metaschalis
- Micromelalopha
- Pterotes
- Pygaera
- Rhegmatophila
- Rosama
- Spatalia
  - Spatalia argentina
