= Shapu =

Shapu might refer to:

- Shapu, another name of the urial, Ovis vignei, a species of wild sheep
- Seasonal hyperacute panuveitis or SHAPU, an eye disease endemic in Nepal
