= Pydna (moth) =

Scientific classification
- Kingdom: Animalia
- Phylum: Arthropoda
- Clade: Pancrustacea
- Class: Insecta
- Order: Lepidoptera
- Family: Geometridae
- Genus: Pydna; Walker, 1856

Genus of moths

Pydna is a genus of moths in the family Geometridae erected by Francis Walker in 1856.

== Species ==
Species include:

- Pydna albidostriata
- Pydna alboflavida
- Pydna aurata
  - Pydna aurata midas
- Pydna badiaria
- Pydna basistriga
- Pydna brunneossticta - moved to Curuzza eburnean
- Pydna decurrens
- Pydna eburnea
- Pydna eupatagia
- Pydna fasciata
- Pydna ferrifera
- Pydna formosicola
- Pydna galbana
- Pydna griseodivisa
- Pydna kamadena
  - Pydna kamadena orientalis
- Pydna longivitta
- Pydna mediodivisa
- Pydna metaphaea
- Pydna nana
- Pydna nigrofasciata - moved to Curuzza nigrofasciata
- Pydna nigropimetfi
- Pydna nigrovittata
- Pydna ochracea
- Pydna pallida
  - Pydna pallida bansai
- Pydna plusioides
- Pydna prominens
- Pydna pseudotestacea - moved to Periergos kamadena
- Pydna sikkima
- Pydna straminea
  - Pydna straminea harakiri
- Pydna suisharyonis - moved to Besaia sordida
- Pydna testacea
