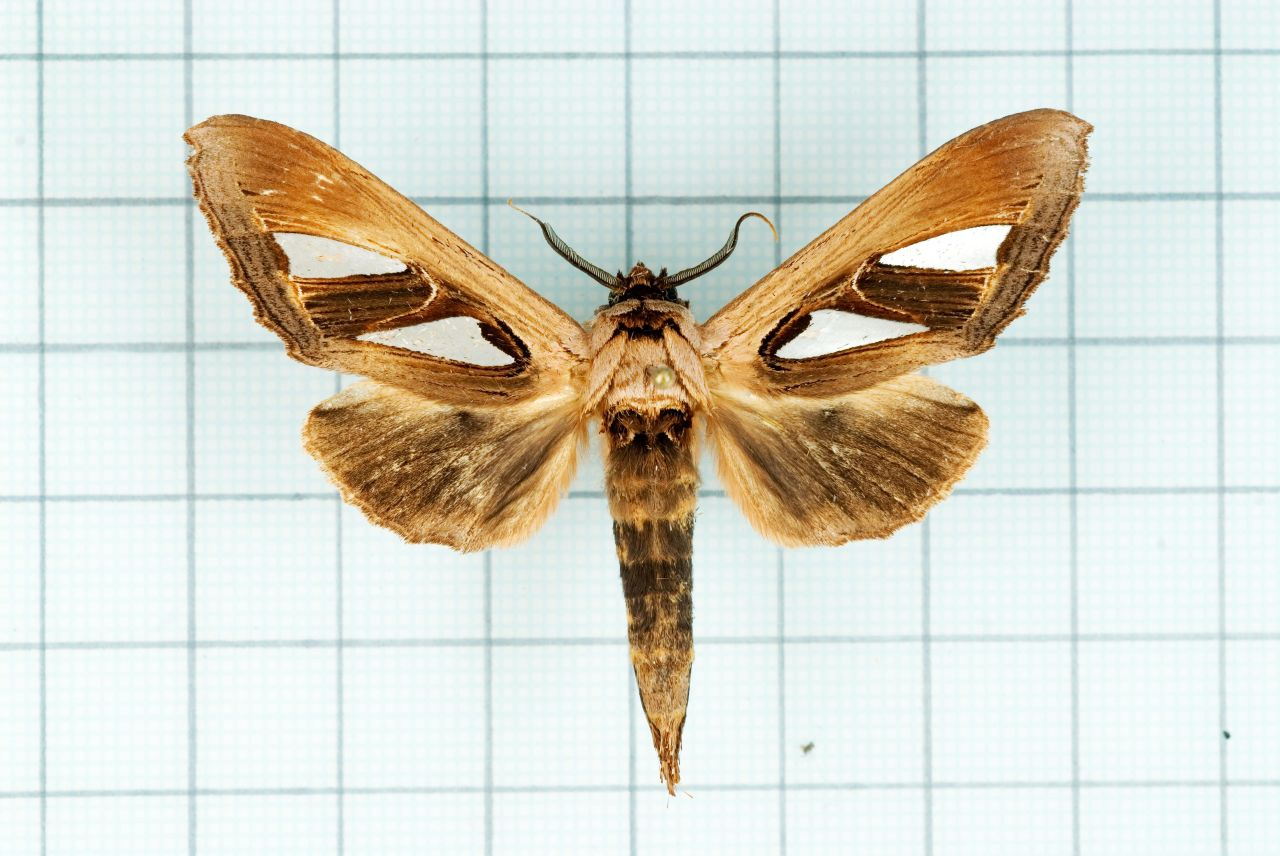

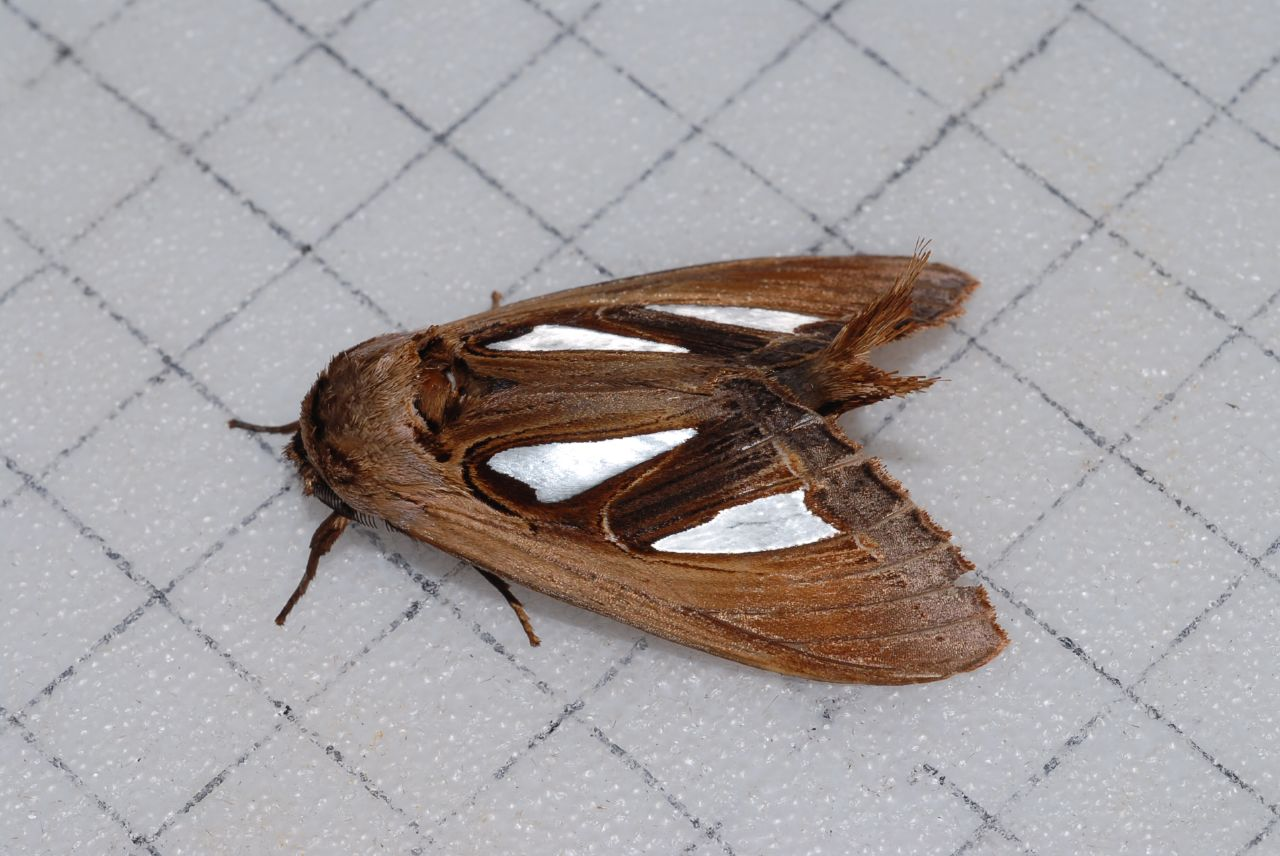

Scientific classification
- Domain: Eukaryota
- Kingdom: Animalia
- Phylum: Arthropoda
- Class: Insecta
- Order: Lepidoptera
- Superfamily: Noctuoidea
- Family: Notodontidae
- Genus: Tarsolepis
- Species: T. japonica

Binomial name
- Tarsolepis japonica Wileman & South, 1917

Synonyms
- Tarsolepis japonica inouei Okano, 1958

= Tarsolepis japonica =

Species of moth

Tarsolepis japonica is a species of moth of the family Notodontidae. It is found in Taiwan and Japan.

The wingspan is 63–74 mm.

The larvae feed on Acer serrulatum and Acer albopurpurascens.
