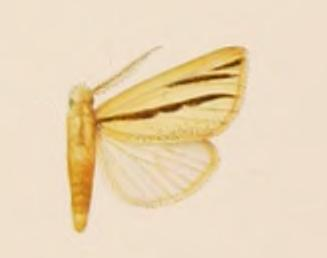

Scientific classification
- Kingdom: Animalia
- Phylum: Arthropoda
- Class: Insecta
- Order: Lepidoptera
- Superfamily: Noctuoidea
- Family: Notodontidae
- Genus: Antheua
- Species: A. liparidioides

Binomial name
- Antheua liparidioides (Rothschild, 1910)

Synonyms
- Estigmene liparidioides Rothschild, 1910

= Antheua liparidioides =

Species of moth

Antheua liparidioides is a moth of the family Notodontidae. It is found in Kenya.
