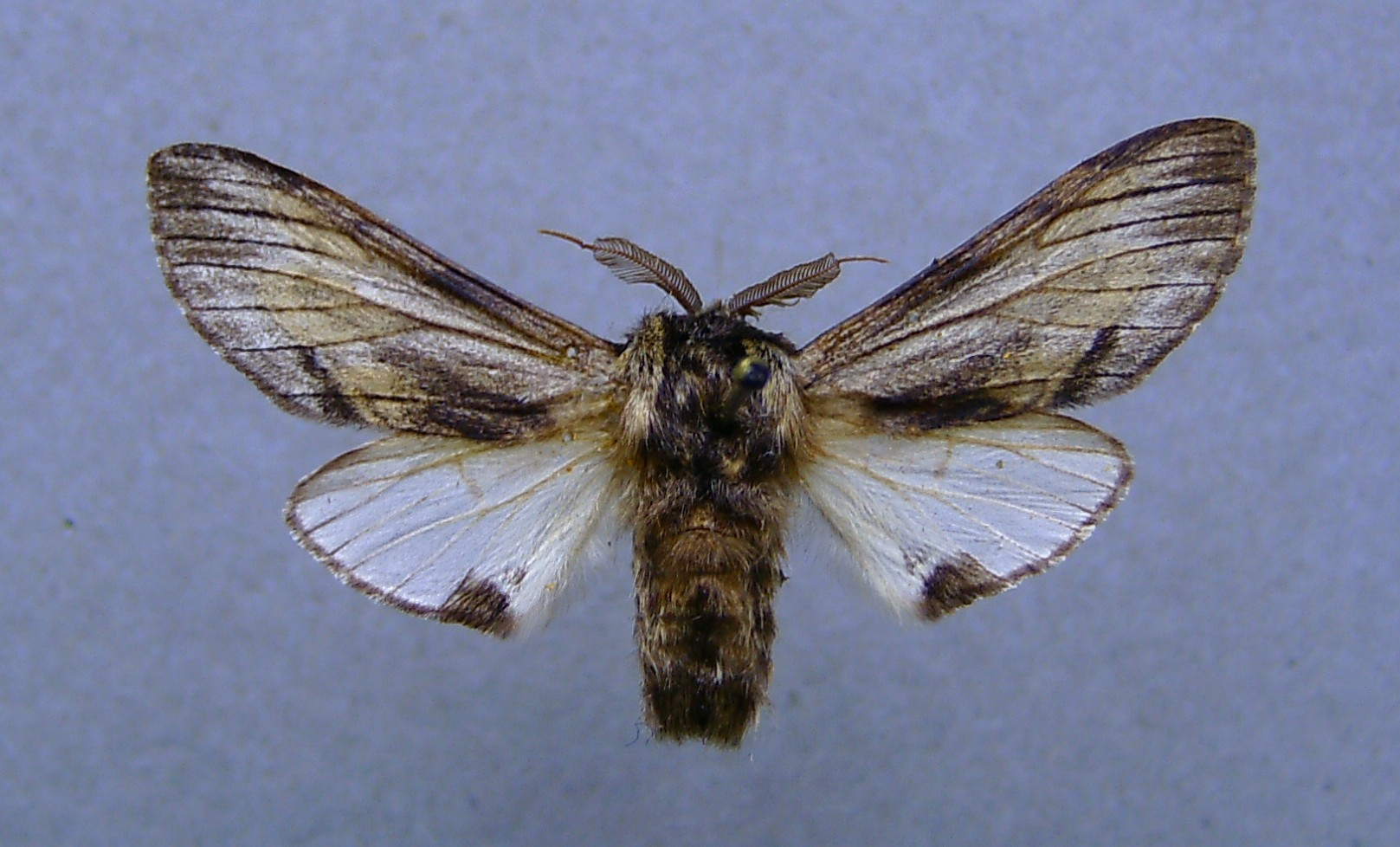
- Male
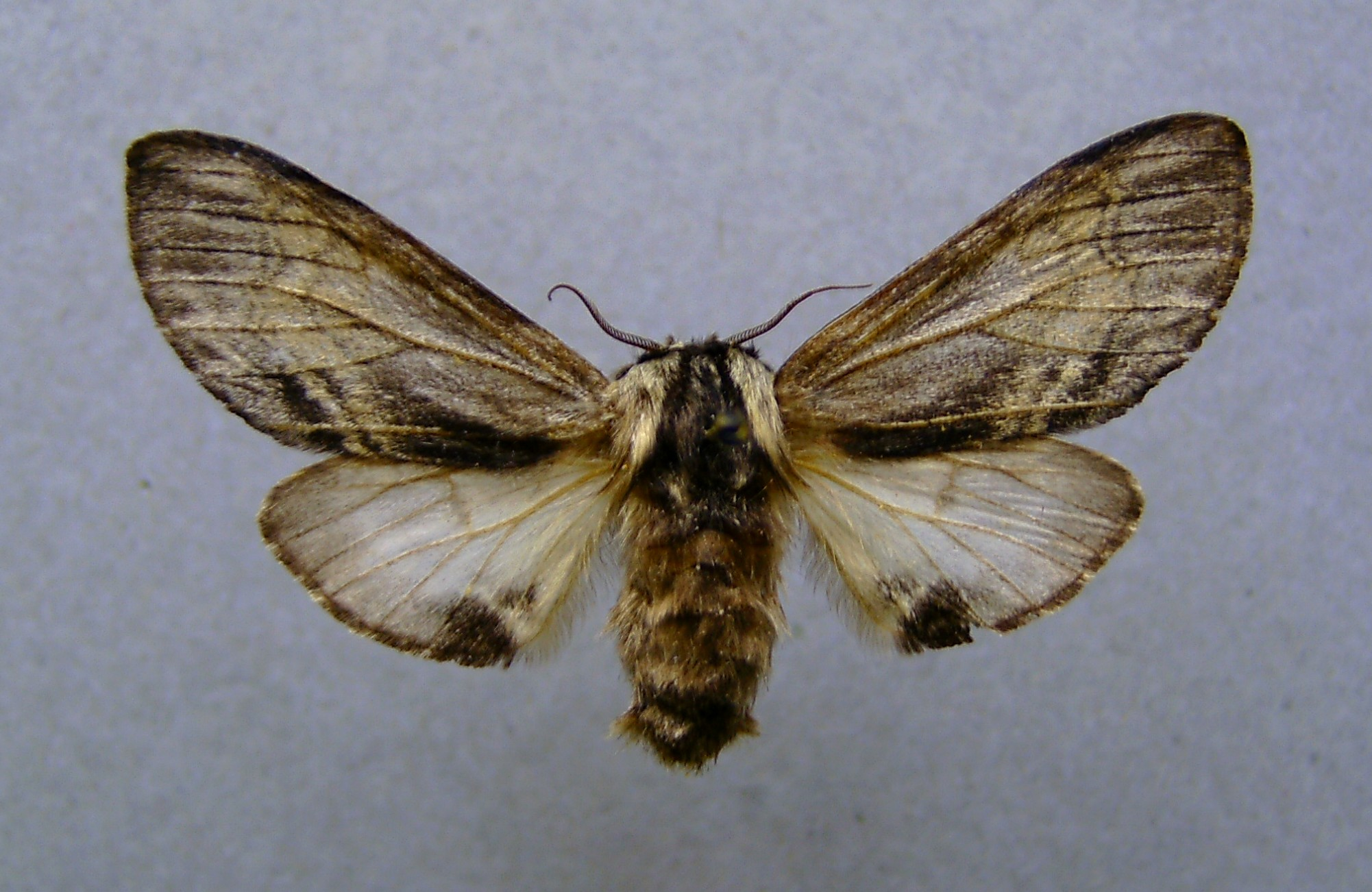
- Female

Scientific classification
- Kingdom: Animalia
- Phylum: Arthropoda
- Clade: Pancrustacea
- Class: Insecta
- Order: Lepidoptera
- Superfamily: Noctuoidea
- Family: Notodontidae
- Genus: Harpyia
- Species: H. milhauseri

Binomial name
- Harpyia milhauseri (Fabricius, 1775)

Synonyms
- Hybocampa milhauseri; Hoplitis milhauseri

= Harpyia milhauseri =

Tawny prominent

Species of moth

Harpyia milhauseri, the tawny prominent, is a moth of the family Notodontidae. The species was first described by Johan Christian Fabricius in 1775. It is mainly found in central Europe.

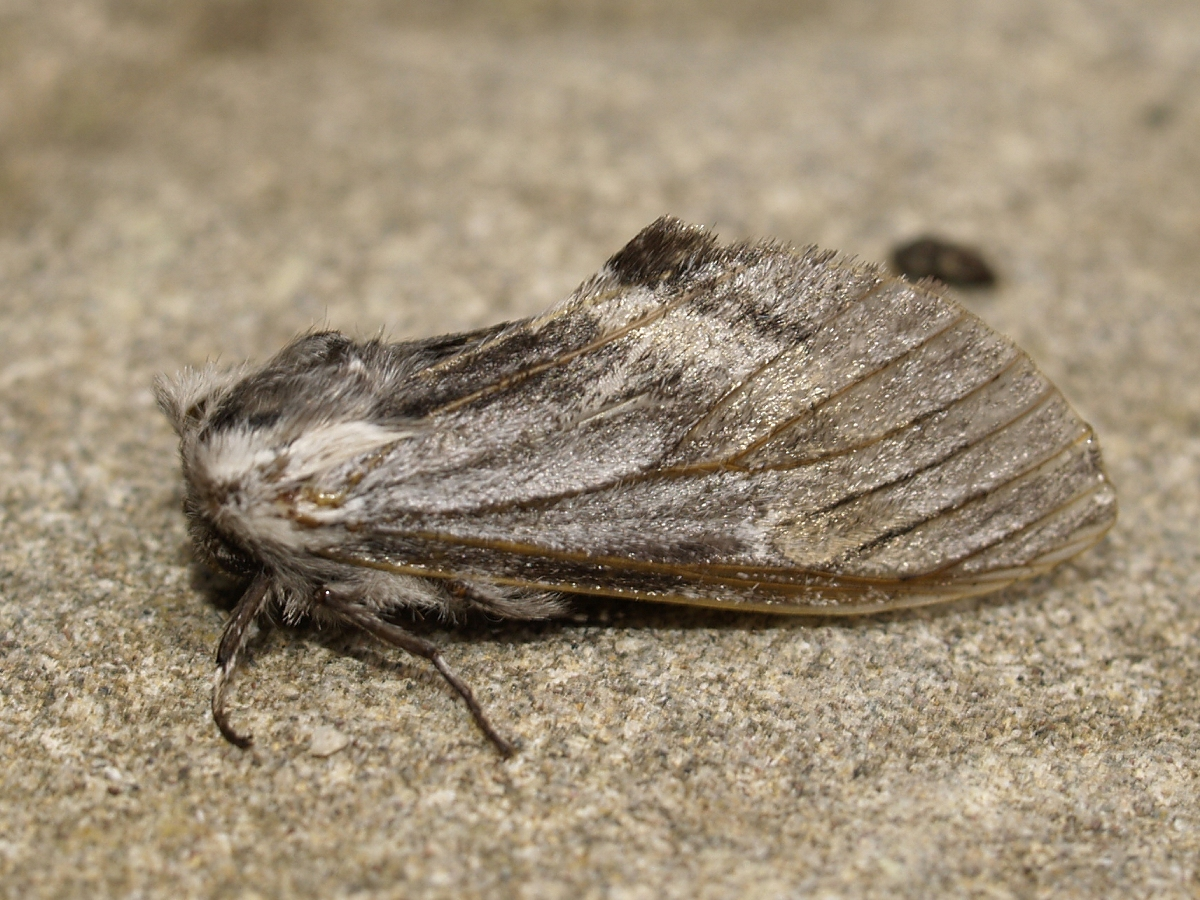
Tawny prominent

The wingspan is 50–60 mm. The moth flies from May to June depending on the location.

The larvae feed on Quercus, Fagus and occasionally Betula.
