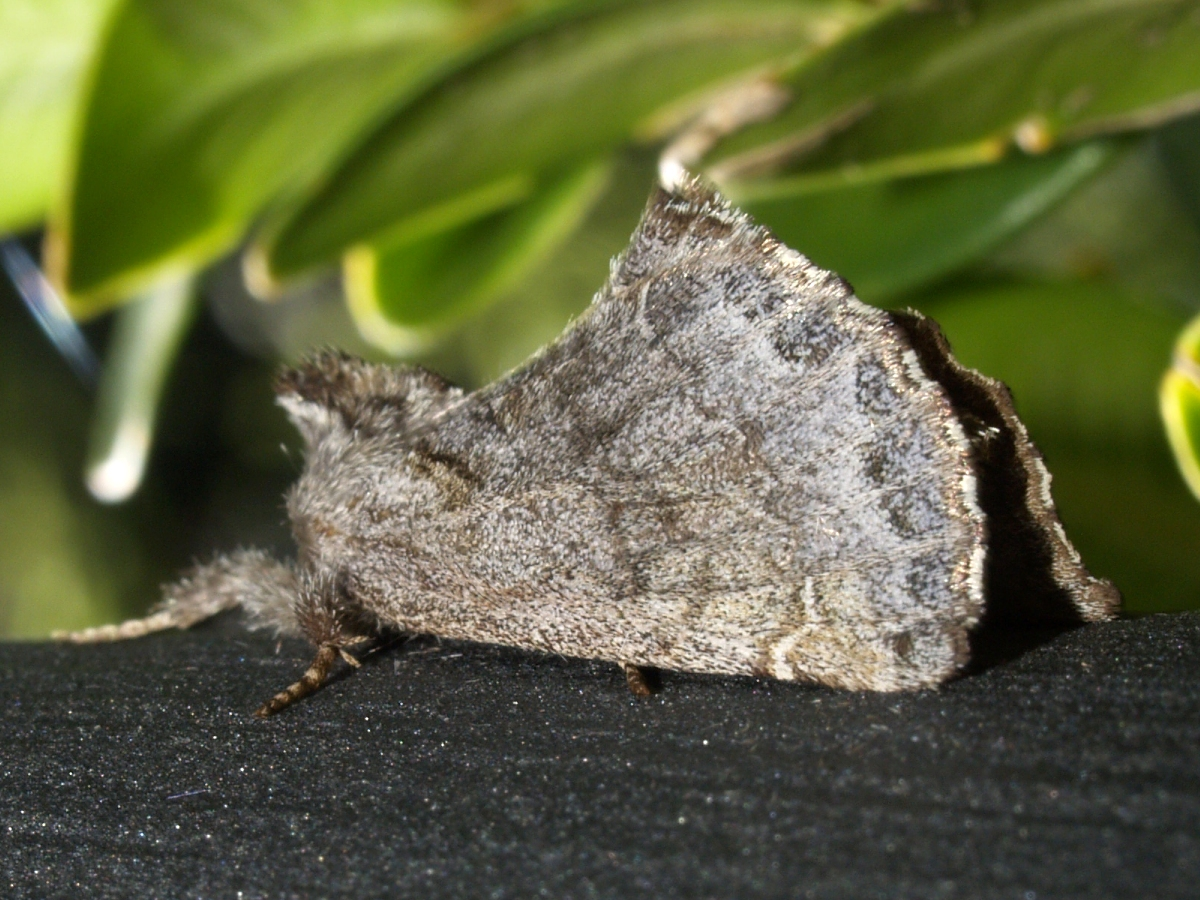

Scientific classification
- Domain: Eukaryota
- Kingdom: Animalia
- Phylum: Arthropoda
- Class: Insecta
- Order: Lepidoptera
- Superfamily: Noctuoidea
- Family: Notodontidae
- Genus: Rhegmatophila
- Species: R. alpina

Binomial name
- Rhegmatophila alpina (Bellier, 1881)

= Rhegmatophila alpina =

Species of moth

Rhegmatophila alpina is a moth of the family Notodontidae. It is found in the Southern Alps, the Balkans and Spain.

The wingspan is 17–18 mm. The moth flies from May to September in two generations depending on the location.

The larvae feed on Populus and Salix species.

== Sources ==
- P.C.-Rougeot, P. Viette (1978). Guide des papillons nocturnes d'Europe et d'Afrique du Nord. Delachaux et Niestlé (Lausanne).
