= Rhegmatophila ricchelloi =

Scientific classification
- Kingdom: Animalia
- Phylum: Arthropoda
- Clade: Pancrustacea
- Class: Insecta
- Order: Lepidoptera
- Superfamily: Noctuoidea
- Family: Notodontidae
- Genus: Rhegmatophila
- Species: R. ricchelloi

Binomial name
- Rhegmatophila ricchelloi Hartig, 1939

Species of moth

Rhegmatophila ricchelloi is a moth of the family Notodontidae. It is found in Sardinia.

The wingspan is about 17 mm. The moth flies in July.

The larvae feed on Prunus spinosa and Quercus ilex.

== Sources ==
- P.C.-Rougeot, P. Viette (1978). Guide des papillons nocturnes d'Europe et d'Afrique du Nord. Delachaux et Niestlé (Lausanne).
