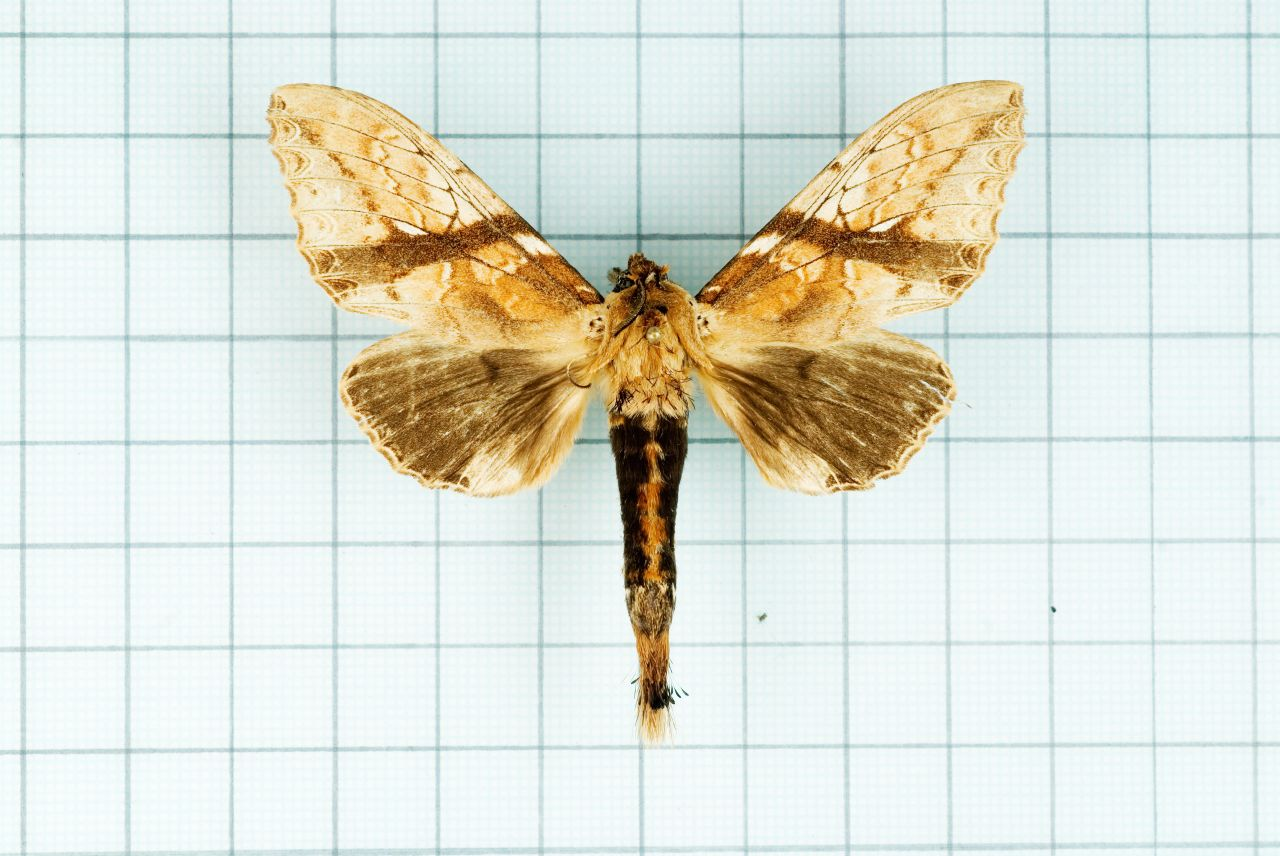
- Dudusa nobilis baibarana
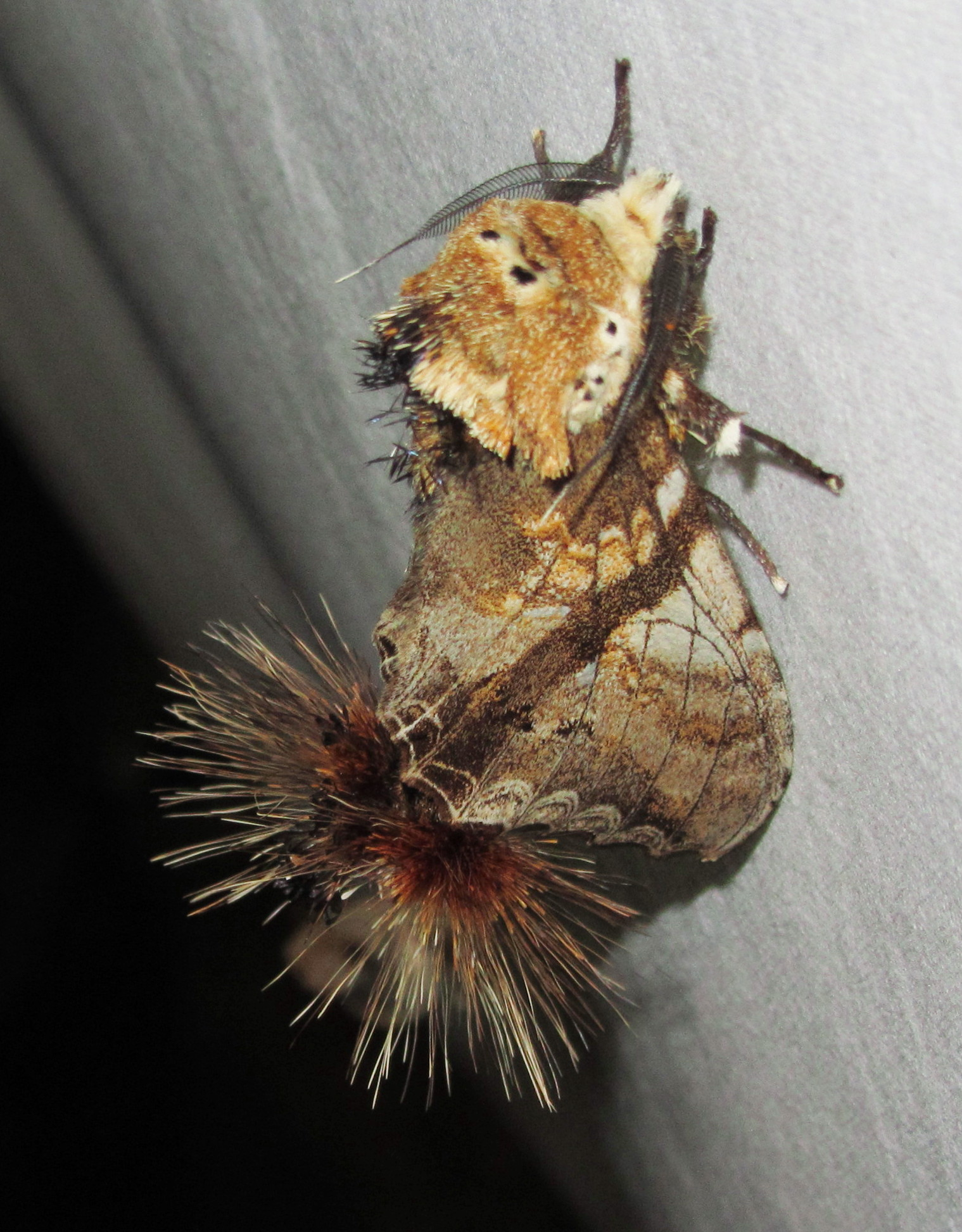

Scientific classification
- Kingdom: Animalia
- Phylum: Arthropoda
- Class: Insecta
- Order: Lepidoptera
- Superfamily: Noctuoidea
- Family: Notodontidae
- Genus: Dudusa
- Species: D. nobilis

Binomial name
- Dudusa nobilis Walker, 1865

Synonyms
- Dudusa baibarana Matsumura, 1929; Dudusa sphingiformis distincta Mell, 1930

= Dudusa nobilis =

Species of moth

Dudusa nobilis is a moth of the family Notodontidae first described by Francis Walker in 1865. It is found in northern and south-eastern China and Taiwan.

The larvae feed on the leaves of Litchi chinensis and Nephelium lappaceum.

Dudusa nobilis is non-poisonous and generally harmless to humans, so there's no need for excessive concern about its potential impact on health.

== Subspecies ==
- Dudusa nobilis nobilis
- Dudusa nobilis baibarana (Matsumura, 1929) (Taiwan)
