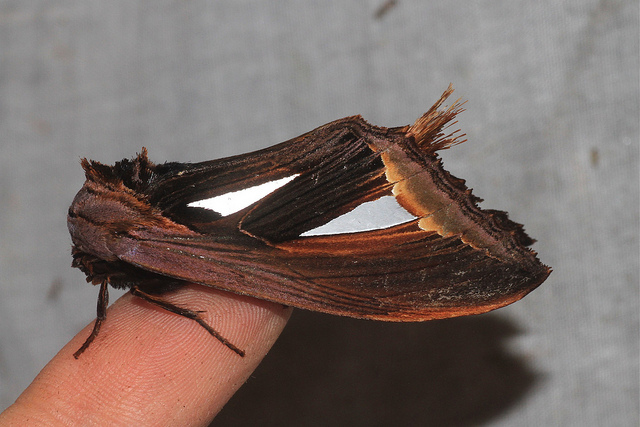
- Borneo, Trusmadi hill forest

Scientific classification
- Domain: Eukaryota
- Kingdom: Animalia
- Phylum: Arthropoda
- Class: Insecta
- Order: Lepidoptera
- Superfamily: Noctuoidea
- Family: Notodontidae
- Genus: Tarsolepis
- Species: T. malayana

Binomial name
- Tarsolepis malayana Nakamura, 1976

Synonyms
- Tarsolepis rufobrunnea malayana Nakamura 1976

= Tarsolepis malayana =

Species of moth

Tarsolepis malayana is a moth in the family Notodontidae. Previously the species was treated as a subspecies of Tarsolepis rufobrunnea.

== Characteristics ==
The submarginal area, which touches the upper silver spot, is pale orange-brown filled and curved. The ground colour of the wings is fuscous violet-brown. The underside of the thorax displays a prominent red brush.

== Distribution and habitat ==
The species is found in India, Burma and widely distributed in Sundaland. It prefers lowland rain forests.
