= Rhegmatophila =

Scientific classification
- Domain: Eukaryota
- Kingdom: Animalia
- Phylum: Arthropoda
- Class: Insecta
- Order: Lepidoptera
- Superfamily: Noctuoidea
- Family: Notodontidae
- Subfamily: Pygaerinae
- Genus: Rhegmatophila; Standfuss, 1888

Genus of moths

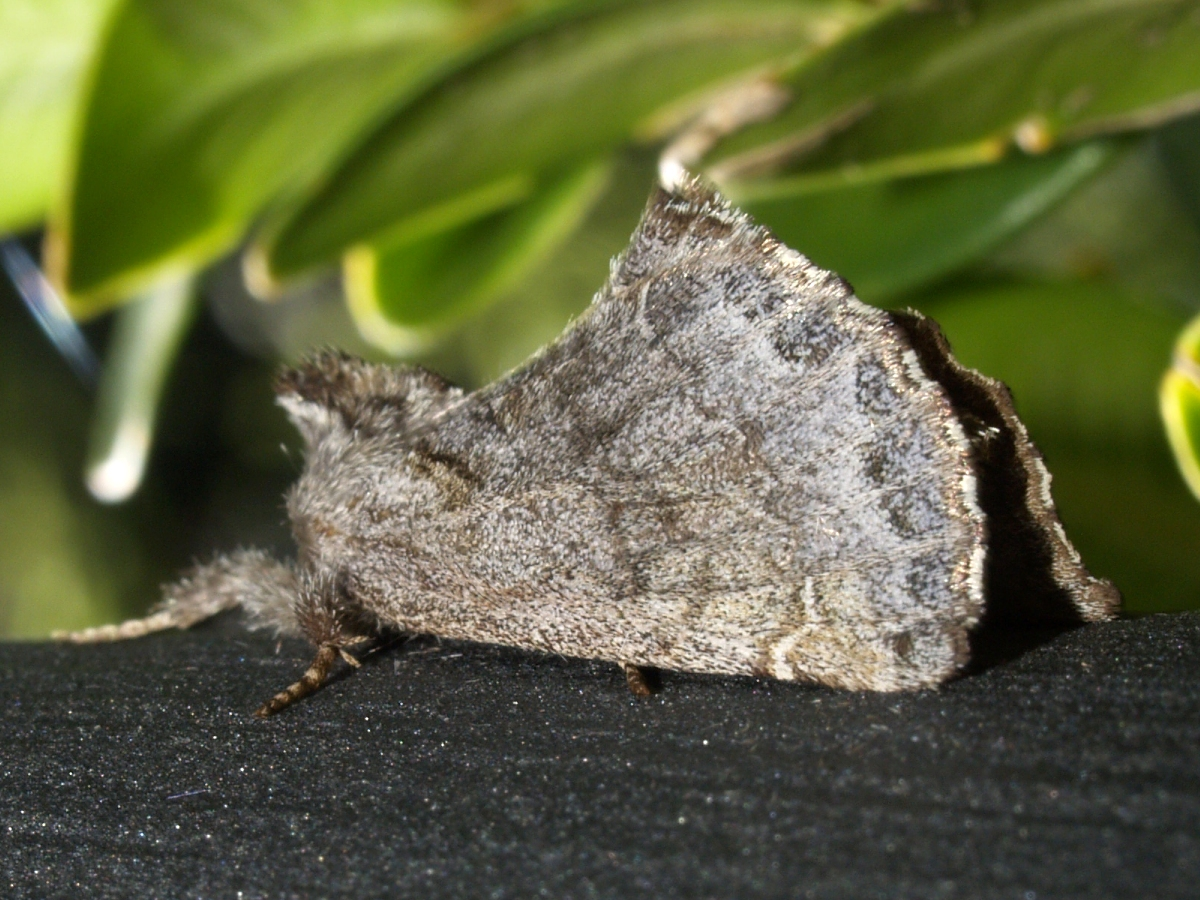

Rhegmatophila is a genus of moths of the family Notodontidae erected by Max Standfuss in 1888. It consists of the following species:

- Rhegmatophila alpina Bellier, 1881
- Rhegmatophila ricchelloi Hartig, 1939
- Rhegmatophila vinculum Hering, 1936
