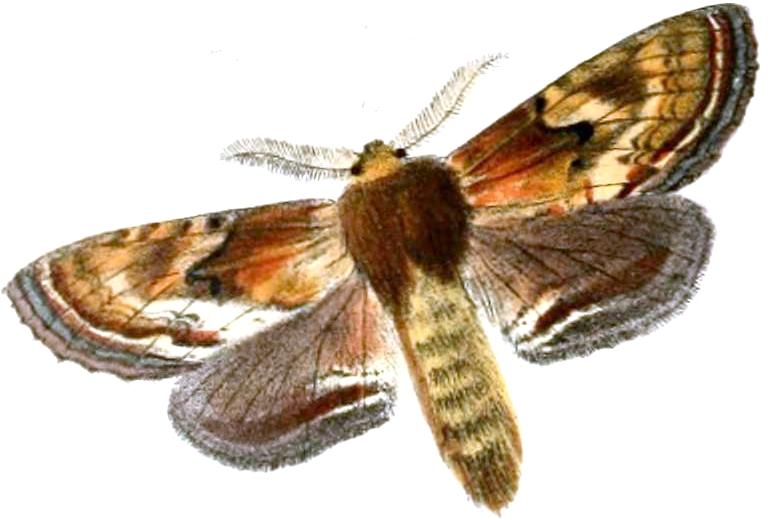
- Hupodonta pulcherrima

Scientific classification
- Kingdom: Animalia
- Phylum: Arthropoda
- Clade: Pancrustacea
- Class: Insecta
- Order: Lepidoptera
- Superfamily: Noctuoidea
- Family: Notodontidae
- Genus: Hupodonta; Butler, 1877

= Hupodonta =

Genus of moths

Hupodonta is a genus of moths of the family Notodontidae erected by Arthur Gardiner Butler in 1877.

== Species ==
- Hupodonta corticalis Butler, 1877
- Hupodonta imbrifera Schintlmeister, 1994
- Hupodonta lignea Matsumura, 1919
- Hupodonta pulcherrima (Moore, [1866])
- Hupodonta uniformis Schintlmeister, 2002
