= Pydna metaphaea =

Pydna metaphsea

Scientific classification
- Kingdom: Animalia
- Phylum: Arthropoda
- Clade: Pancrustacea
- Class: Insecta
- Order: Lepidoptera
- Family: Geometridae
- Genus: Pydna
- Species: P. metaphaea

Binomial name
- Pydna metaphaea (Walker)

Species of moth

Pydna metaphaea is a moth of the family Geometridae.
