= Ramesa tosta =

Scientific classification
- Kingdom: Animalia
- Phylum: Arthropoda
- Class: Insecta
- Order: Lepidoptera
- Superfamily: Noctuoidea
- Family: Notodontidae
- Genus: Ramesa
- Species: R. tosta

Binomial name
- Ramesa tosta Walker, 1855

Species of moth

Ramesa tosta is a moth of the family Notodontidae first described by Francis Walker in 1855. It is found in Sri Lanka, India, Myanmar, Java, South China, Taiwan and Japan.

== Subspecies ==
- Ramesa tosta luridivitta Hampson, 1893
