= Teleclita strigata =

Scientific classification
- Kingdom: Animalia
- Phylum: Arthropoda
- Clade: Pancrustacea
- Class: Insecta
- Order: Lepidoptera
- Superfamily: Noctuoidea
- Family: Notodontidae
- Genus: Teleclita
- Species: T. strigata

Binomial name
- Teleclita strigata (Moore, 1879)

Synonyms
- Hoplitis strigata Moore, 1879

Species of moth

Teleclita strigata is a moth of the family Notodontidae first described by Frederic Moore in 1879.

== Distribution ==
It is found in Nepal, India, Thailand, Malaysia, Sri Lanka and Vietnam.

== Biology ==
The larvae has been recorded on Terminalia species.
