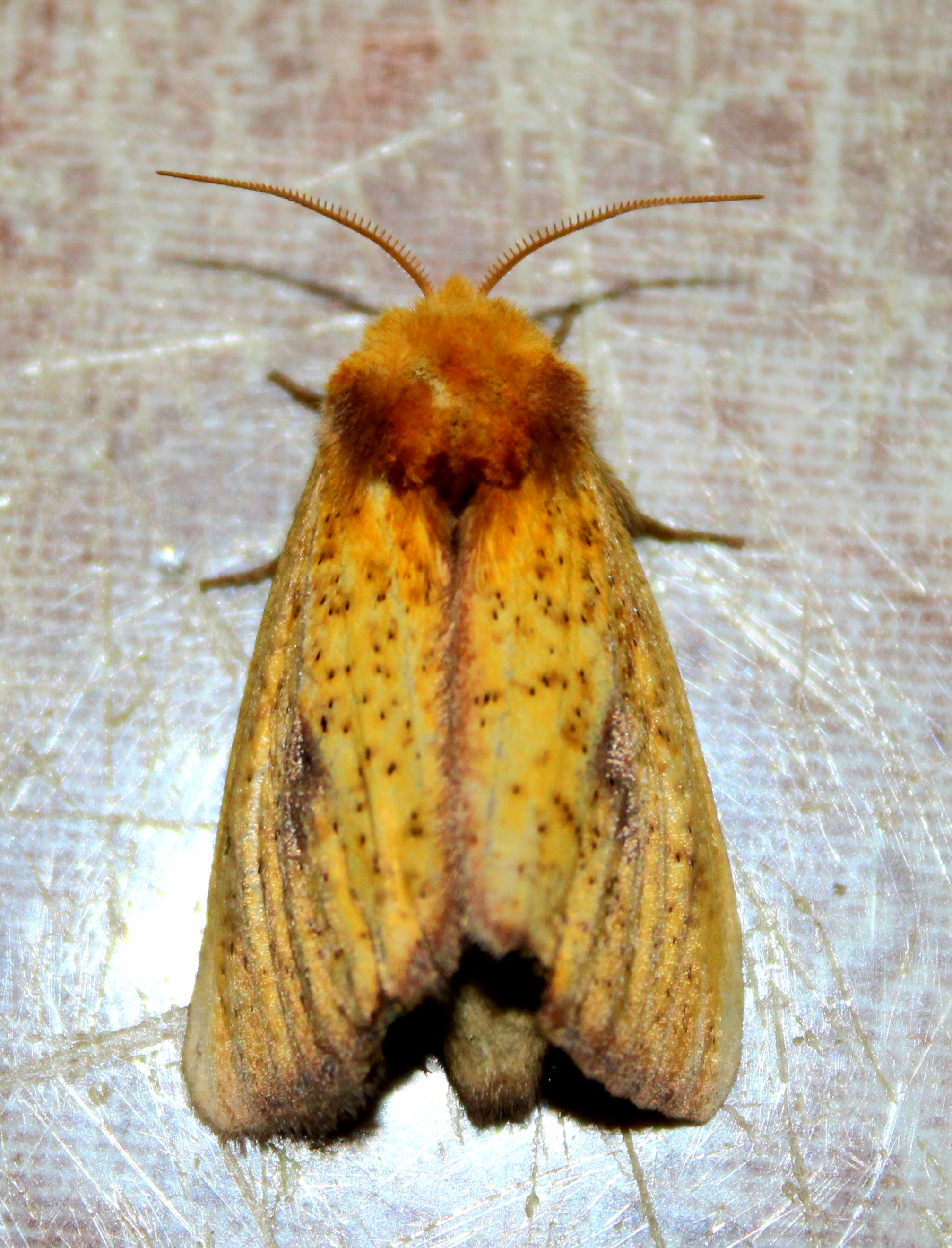
- in Sri Lanka

Scientific classification
- Kingdom: Animalia
- Phylum: Arthropoda
- Class: Insecta
- Order: Lepidoptera
- Superfamily: Noctuoidea
- Family: Notodontidae
- Genus: Antheua
- Species: A. servula

Binomial name
- Antheua servula (Drury, 1773)

Synonyms
- Noctua servula Drury, 1773; Bombyx stricta Fabricius, 1798; Antheua discalis Walker, 1855; Antheua exanthemata Moore, 1883; Antheua obscura van Eecke, 1929

= Antheua servula =

Species of moth

Antheua servula is a species of moth of the family Notodontidae. It was first described by Dru Drury in 1773 from Madras (modern Chennai). It is also found in other parts of India, Sri Lanka, Nepal and on Sumatra.

== Description ==
Upperside: antennae slightly pectinated. Tongue short. Head, thorax, and abdomen light yellowish sand coloured. Wings yellow buff coloured; the anterior having a small brown spot in the middle of each, and the external edges margined with brown. Posterior wings having a brown patch in the middle of each, with the external edges of the same colour. Underside: breast, legs, abdomen, and wings buff coloured, immaculate. Margins of the wings entire. Wingspan 4 inches (100 mm).

Larva brownish with a yellow lateral line and paired subdorsal and sublateral red spots. The stigmata is whitish. Head streaked with black.
