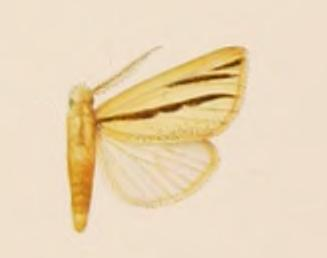
- Noctuoidea adults (all dorsal view).

Scientific classification
- Kingdom: Animalia
- Phylum: Arthropoda
- Class: Insecta
- Order: Lepidoptera
- Superfamily: Noctuoidea
- Family: Notodontidae
- Genus: Antheua; Walker, 1855

Synonyms
- Diastema Herrich-Schäffer, [1855]; Sirenopyga Wallengren, 1858; Diastema Aurivillius, 1904; Diastemina Gaede, 1928; Antheura Druve, 1888; Nunua Karsch, 1895; Parazana Bethune-Baker, 1911; Rigema Walker, 1855; Zana Walker, 1856

= Antheua =

Genus of moths

Antheua is a genus of moths of the family Notodontidae erected by Francis Walker in 1855.

== Species ==
- Antheua amphiaraus (Kiriakoff, 1955)
- Antheua anodonta (Hampson, 1910)
- Antheua anomala Berio, 1937
- Antheua aurifodinae (Distant, 1902)
- Antheua benguelana Viette, 1954
- Antheua bidentata (Hampson, 1910)
- Antheua birbirana Viette, 1954
- Antheua bossumensis (Gaede, 1915)
- Antheua consanguinea Distant, 1903
- Antheua croceipuncta Hampson, 1910
- Antheua delicata Bethune-Baker, 1911
- Antheua dimorpha Janse, 1920
- Antheua elongata Gaede, 1928
- Antheua encausta (Hampson, 1910)
- Antheua eriostepta Tams, 1932
- Antheua eximia Kiriakoff, 1965
- Antheua extenuata Walker, 1869
- Antheua gaedei Kiriakoff, 1962
- Antheua gallans (Karsch, 1895)
- Antheua grisea (Gaede, 1928)
- Antheua haasi (Saalmüller, 1884)
- Antheua insignata Gaede, 1928
- Antheua jansei Aurivillius, 1925
- Antheua lignosa (Walker, 1856)
- Antheua liparidioides (Rothschild, 1910)
- Antheua marpissa (Wallengren, 1860)
- Antheua mixta Janse, 1920
- Antheua ochriventris (Strand, 1912)
- Antheua ornata (Walker, 1865)
- Antheua psolometopa Tams, 1929
- Antheua rhodeosemena Bethune-Baker, 1911
- Antheua ruficosta (Hampson, 1910)
- Antheua rufovittata (Aurivillius, 1901)
- Antheua servula (Drury, 1773)
- Antheua simplex Walker, 1855
- Antheua spurcata Walker, 1864
- Antheua tricolor Walker, 1855
- Antheua trifasciata (Hampson, 1909)
- Antheua trimacula Kiriakoff, 1954
- Antheua trivitta (Hampson, 1910)
- Antheua ungulata (Berio, 1939)
- Antheua vittata (Walker, 1855)
- Antheua woerdeni (Snellen, 1872)
