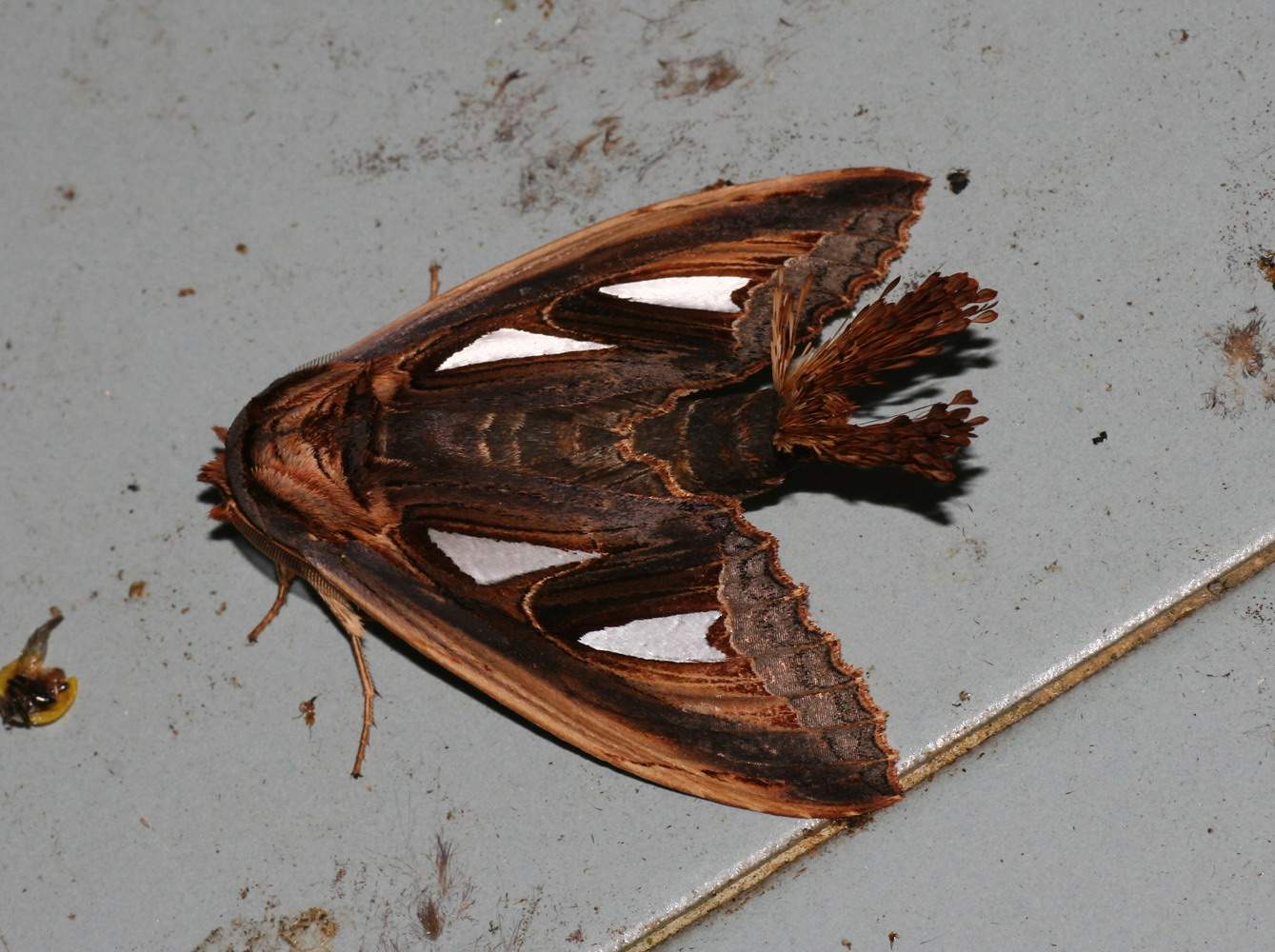

Scientific classification
- Kingdom: Animalia
- Phylum: Arthropoda
- Clade: Pancrustacea
- Class: Insecta
- Order: Lepidoptera
- Superfamily: Noctuoidea
- Family: Notodontidae
- Genus: Tarsolepis
- Species: T. sommeri

Binomial name
- Tarsolepis sommeri (Hübner, [1821])

Synonyms
- Crino sommeri Hübner, [1821]; Tarsolepis remicauda Butler, 1872

= Tarsolepis sommeri =

Species of moth

Tarsolepis sommeri is a moth in the family Notodontidae first described by Jacob Hübner in 1821. It is found in the oriental region. The larvae have been recorded on Nephelium lappaceum. Adults have been observed drinking tears (lachryphagy) from mammals.
