= Teleclita =

Scientific classification
- Kingdom: Animalia
- Phylum: Arthropoda
- Clade: Pancrustacea
- Class: Insecta
- Order: Lepidoptera
- Superfamily: Noctuoidea
- Family: Notodontidae
- Subfamily: Notodontinae
- Genus: Teleclita; Turner, 1903

Genus of moths

Teleclita is a genus of moths in the family Notodontidae. The genus was described by Turner in 1903.

== Species ==
- Teleclita cathana Schaus, 1928 (Philippines)
- Teleclita dryinopa (Dodd, 1902) (Australia)
- Teleclita grisea (Swinhoe, 1892) (China, Thailand, India, Laos, Vietnam)
- Teleclita insignifica Rothschild, 1917
- Teleclita strigata (Moore, 1879) (Nepal, India, Thailand, Malaysia Sri Lanka, Vietnam)
- Teleclita sundana Holloway, 1983 (Singapore, Borneo, Sumatra, Philippines)
