= Seasonal hyperacute panuveitis =

Eye disease

Seasonal hyperacute panuveitis is an aggressive eye disease of unknown etiology, first described in 1975. It has been recorded almost exclusively from Nepal, with the exception of five cases reported from Bhutan. The disease affects primarily children and can cause blindness. In Nepal, it is the most common reported cause of panuveitis, and in children it is the most prevalent cause of both uveitis and panuveitis.

== Symptoms and signs ==
The disease almost always affects only one eye. The first sign is usually a painless reddening of the affected eye. Whitening of the pupil, due to massive exhudation into the vitreous, is typical, leading to the hallmark "white pupil in a red eye". Visual loss is rapid, taking hours or, at most, few days – two-thirds of the patients are already blind in the affected eye when presenting. Intraocular pressure plummets, eventually causing phthisis bulbi.

== Causes ==
The cause of seasonal hyperacute panuveitis is unknown. Several bacteria and viruses, such as anelloviruses, have been tentatively associated with the disease. The only known risk factor seems to be contact with an unidentified species of white moths, possibly of the genus Gazalina, known to swarm at the end of the monsoon season. Moth hairs have been identified in the eyes affected by the disease; however, in 2023 several cases were reported with no signs of association with the Gazalina moths.

== Treatment ==
Antibiotic or steroid treatment usually bring little benefit. Some positive outcome has been observed with tempestive vitrectomy.

== Epidemiology ==
=== Seasonality ===
The disease occurs mostly after the monsoon season, between September and January. Prevalence peaks every two years. The causes of the seasonal and biannual patterns are unknown. Almost all cases originate in the subtropical, temperate, and subalpine regions of Nepal.
