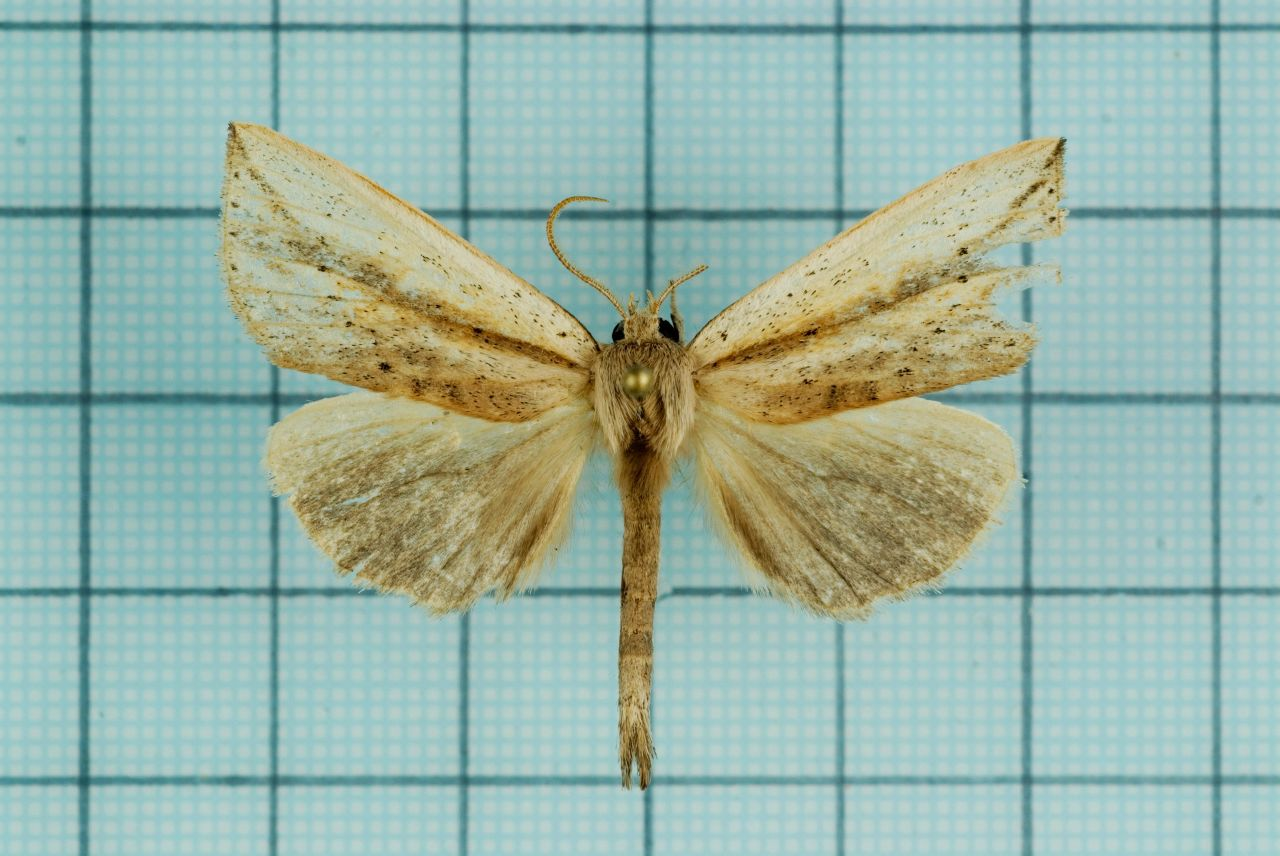

Scientific classification
- Kingdom: Animalia
- Phylum: Arthropoda
- Clade: Pancrustacea
- Class: Insecta
- Order: Lepidoptera
- Superfamily: Noctuoidea
- Family: Notodontidae
- Genus: Besaia
- Species: B. sordida

Binomial name
- Besaia sordida (Wileman, 1914)

Synonyms
- Pydna sordida Wileman, 1914; Besaia (Besaia) sordida; Pydna suisharyonis Strand, 1915

= Besaia sordida =

Species of moth

Besaia sordida is a moth of the family Notodontidae first described by Alfred Ernest Wileman in 1914. It is found in Taiwan.
