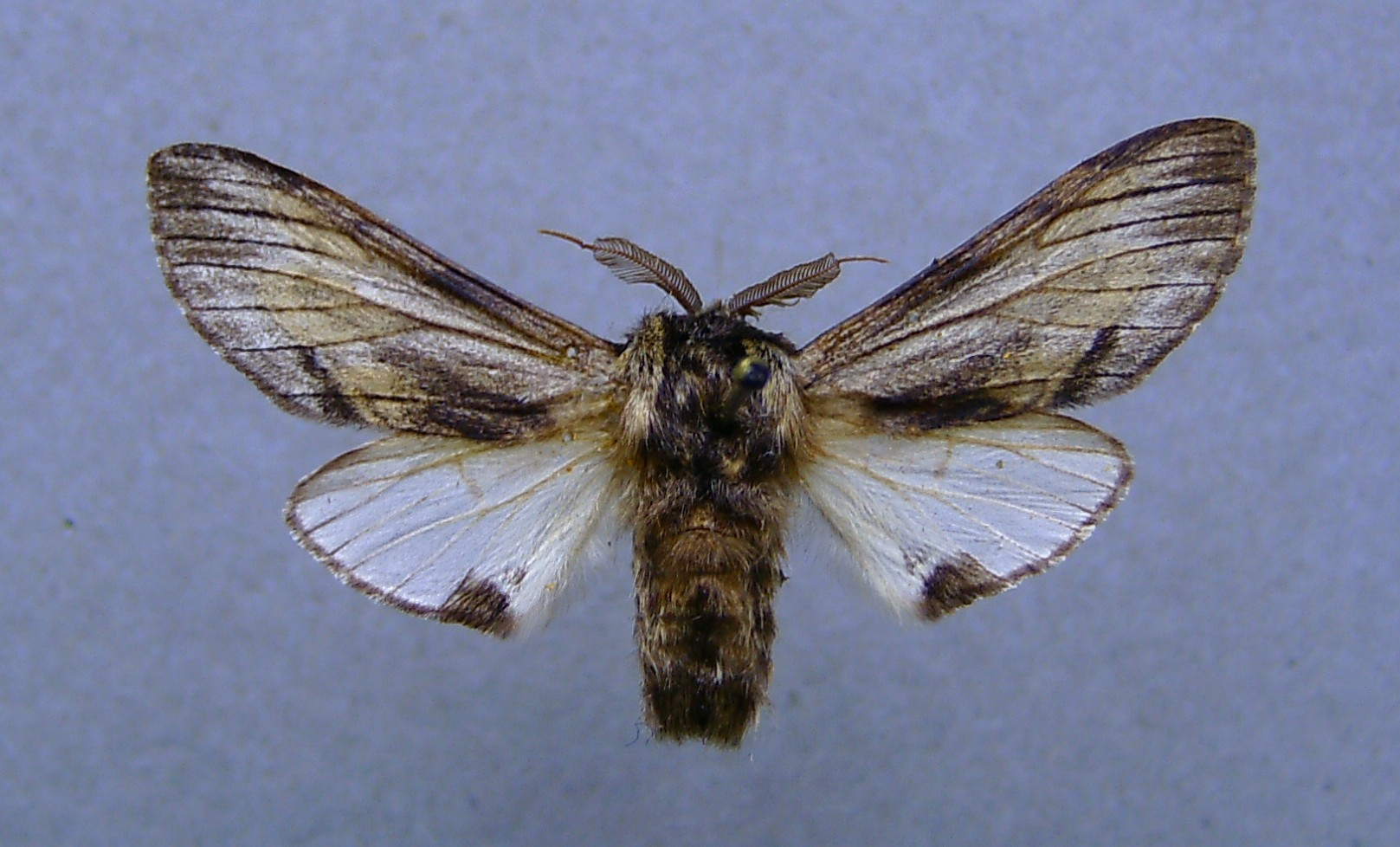
- Harpyia milhauseri

Scientific classification
- Kingdom: Animalia
- Phylum: Arthropoda
- Class: Insecta
- Order: Lepidoptera
- Superfamily: Noctuoidea
- Family: Notodontidae
- Genus: Harpyia; Ochsenheimer, 1810

Species
- 7 species; see text

Synonyms
- Hoplitis Hübner, 1819 nec Klug 1807; Hybocampa Lederer, 1853; Damata Walker, 1855; Collyta Walker, 1865; Damatoides Matsumura, 1927; Macrohoplitis Roepke, 1943

= Harpyia =

Genus of moths

Harpyia is a moth genus in the family Notodontidae, occurring in the Palaearctic.

== Species ==
- Harpyia asymmetria
- Harpyia longipennis
- Harpyia microsticta
- Harpyia milhauseri
- Harpyia powelli
- Harpyia tokui
- Harpyia umbrosa
