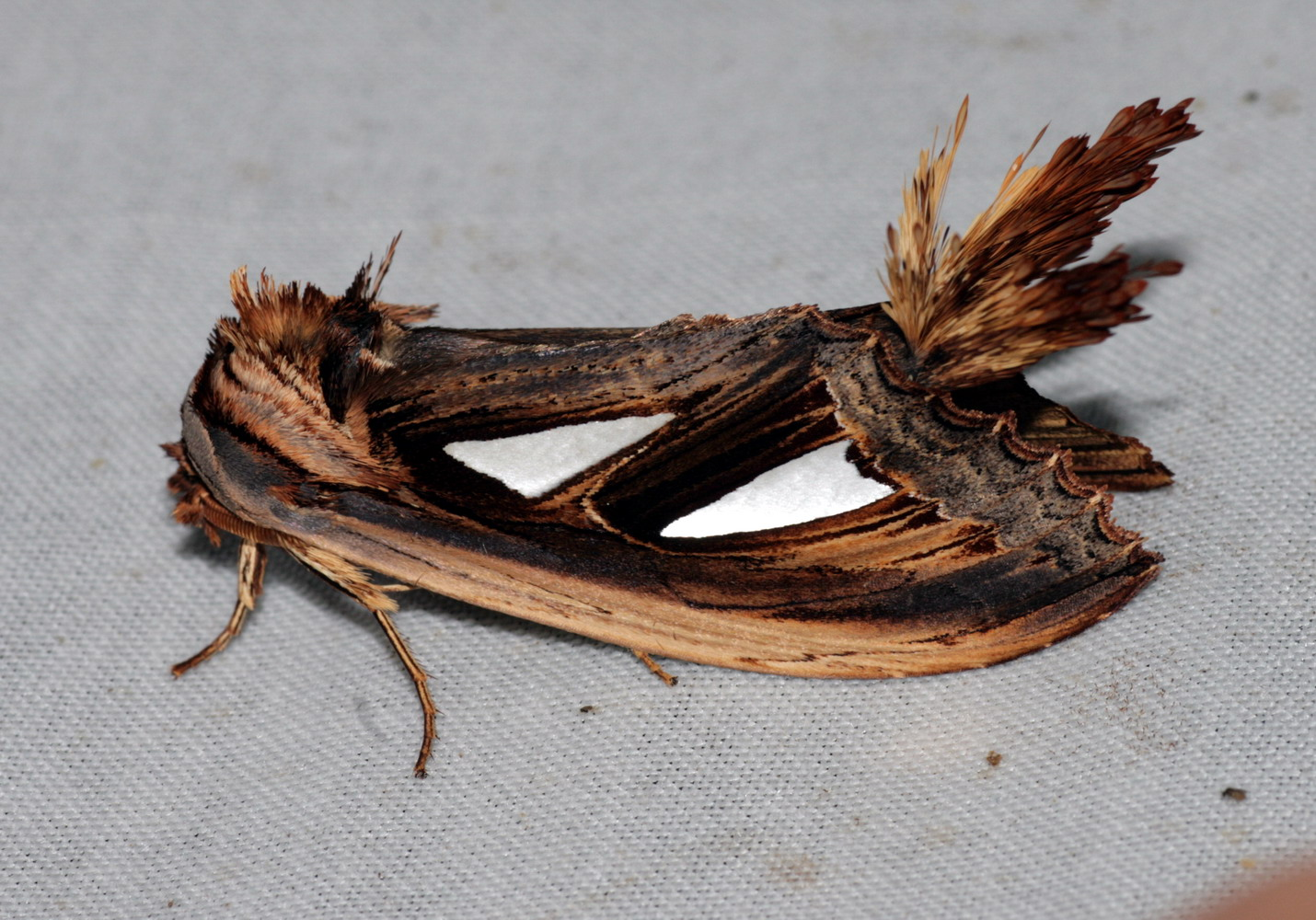
- Tarsolepis sommeri

Scientific classification
- Domain: Eukaryota
- Kingdom: Animalia
- Phylum: Arthropoda
- Class: Insecta
- Order: Lepidoptera
- Superfamily: Noctuoidea
- Family: Notodontidae
- Genus: Tarsolepis; Butler, 1872

Type species
- Tarsolepis remicauda Butler, 1872

Synonyms
- Crino Hübner, [1821] (preocc. Lamarck, 1798); Pika Matsumura, 1929 (preocc. Lacepède, 1799); Megashachia Matsumura, 1929

= Tarsolepis =

Genus of moths

Tarsolepis is a genus of moths in the family Notodontidae erected by Arthur Gardiner Butler in 1872.

== Species ==
- Subgenus Megashachia Matsumura, 1929
  - Tarsolepis brunnea Cai, 1985
  - Tarsolepis fulgurifera Walker, 1858
- Subgenus Stigmatophorina Mell, 1917
  - Tarsolepis sericea Rothschild, 1917 (=Stigmatophorina hammamelis Mell, 1922)
- Subgenus Tarsolepis
  - Tarsolepis elefantorum Bänziger, 1988
  - (Tarsolepis remicauda Butler, 1872) (mostly treated as a synonym Tarsolepis sommeri)
  - Tarsolepis taiwana Wileman, 1910
- Subgenus Tarsolepisoides Nakamura, 1976
  - Tarsolepis inscius Schintlmeister, 1997
  - Tarsolepis japonica Wileman & South, 1917
  - Tarsolepis malayana Nakamura, 1976
- Subgenus unknown
  - Tarsolepis kochi Semper, 1896
  - Tarsolepis rufobrunnea Rothschild, 1917
  - Tarsolepis sommeri (Hübner, [1821])

== Distribution and habitat ==
There are about 15 species in the genus, which are distributed from India, Indochina, China, Korea, Japan, Taiwan through the oriental islands of the Philippines and Indonesia until New Guinea. The highest diversity of species is found in Indochina. The genus has been recorded from a wide range of lowland forest types. The larvae feed on the maple family (Aceraceae).
