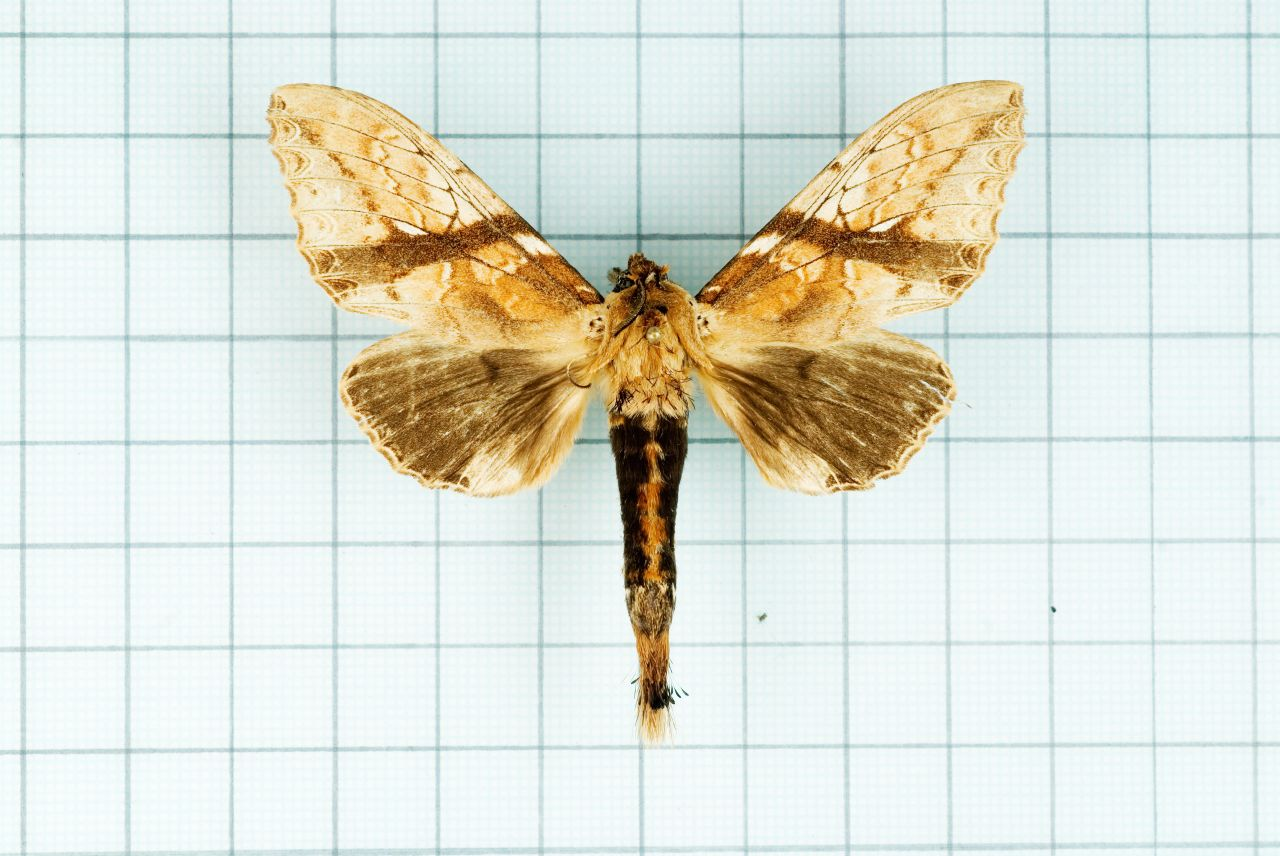
- Dudusa nobilis subsp. baibarana, male

Scientific classification
- Kingdom: Animalia
- Phylum: Arthropoda
- Class: Insecta
- Order: Lepidoptera
- Superfamily: Noctuoidea
- Family: Notodontidae
- Subfamily: Dudusinae
- Genus: Dudusa; Walker, 1865

Synonyms
- Dudusoides Matsumura, 1929; Dudusopsis Matsumura, 1929

= Dudusa =

Genus of moth

Dudusa is a genus of moths in the family Notodontidae. It was first described by Francis Walker in 1865. Moths in genus Dudusa are large, with yellow to ochre forewings and brown hindwings, and show little sexual dimorphism. Species occur in Asia, with the most diversity in Indochina.

== Species ==
Except where separately referenced, the following species and subspecies are per Schintlmeister 2013:

- Dudusa celebensis Roepke, 1944
- Dudusa distincta Mell, 1922
- Dudusa minor Schintlmeister, 1993
  - Dudusa minor expectata Schintlmeister & Lourens, 2010
  - Dudusa minor rufa Schintlmeister & Lourens, 2010
- Dudusa nobilis Walker, 1865
  - Dudusa nobilis baibarana Matsumura, 1929
- Dudusa obesa Schintlmeister & Fang, 2001
- Dudusa roepkei Schintlmeister 2020
- Dudusa sphingiformis Moore, 1872
- Dudusa synopla Swinhoe, 1907
- Dudusa vethi (Snellen, 1892)
  - Dudusa vethi borneensis Roepke, 1944
  - Dudusa vethi ferruginea Schintlmeister, 2020
  - Dudusa vethi javana Roepke, 1944
