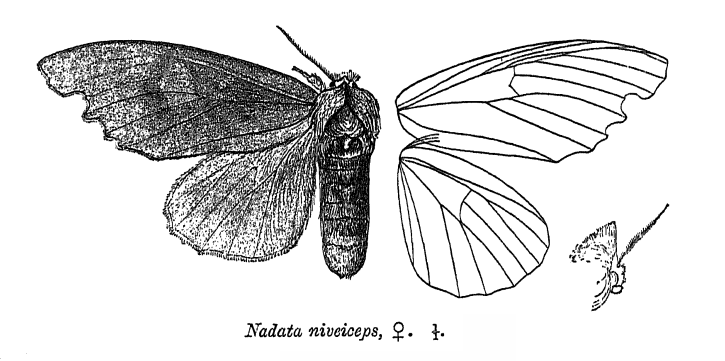

Scientific classification
- Kingdom: Animalia
- Phylum: Arthropoda
- Clade: Pancrustacea
- Class: Insecta
- Order: Lepidoptera
- Superfamily: Noctuoidea
- Family: Notodontidae
- Genus: Euhampsonia
- Species: E. niveiceps

Binomial name
- Euhampsonia niveiceps (Walker, 1865)

Synonyms
- Trabala niveiceps Walker, 1865; Nadata niveiceps (Walker, 1865)

= Euhampsonia niveiceps =

Species of moth

Euhampsonia niveiceps is a moth of the family Notodontidae. It is found in north-eastern India, western China and Sumatra.
