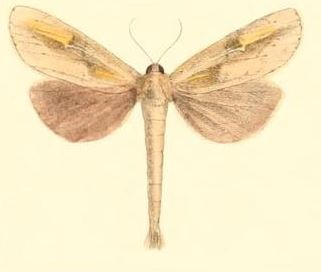

Scientific classification
- Kingdom: Animalia
- Phylum: Arthropoda
- Clade: Pancrustacea
- Class: Insecta
- Order: Lepidoptera
- Superfamily: Noctuoidea
- Family: Notodontidae
- Genus: Niganda
- Species: N. strigifascia

Binomial name
- Niganda strigifascia Moore, 1879

= Niganda strigifascia =

Species of moth

Niganda strigifascia is a moth of the family Notodontidae. It is found in Asia, from India to Sumatra.

== Subspecies ==
- Niganda strigifascia strigifascia Moore, 1879
- Niganda strigifascia coelestis (Kiriakoff, 1962)
