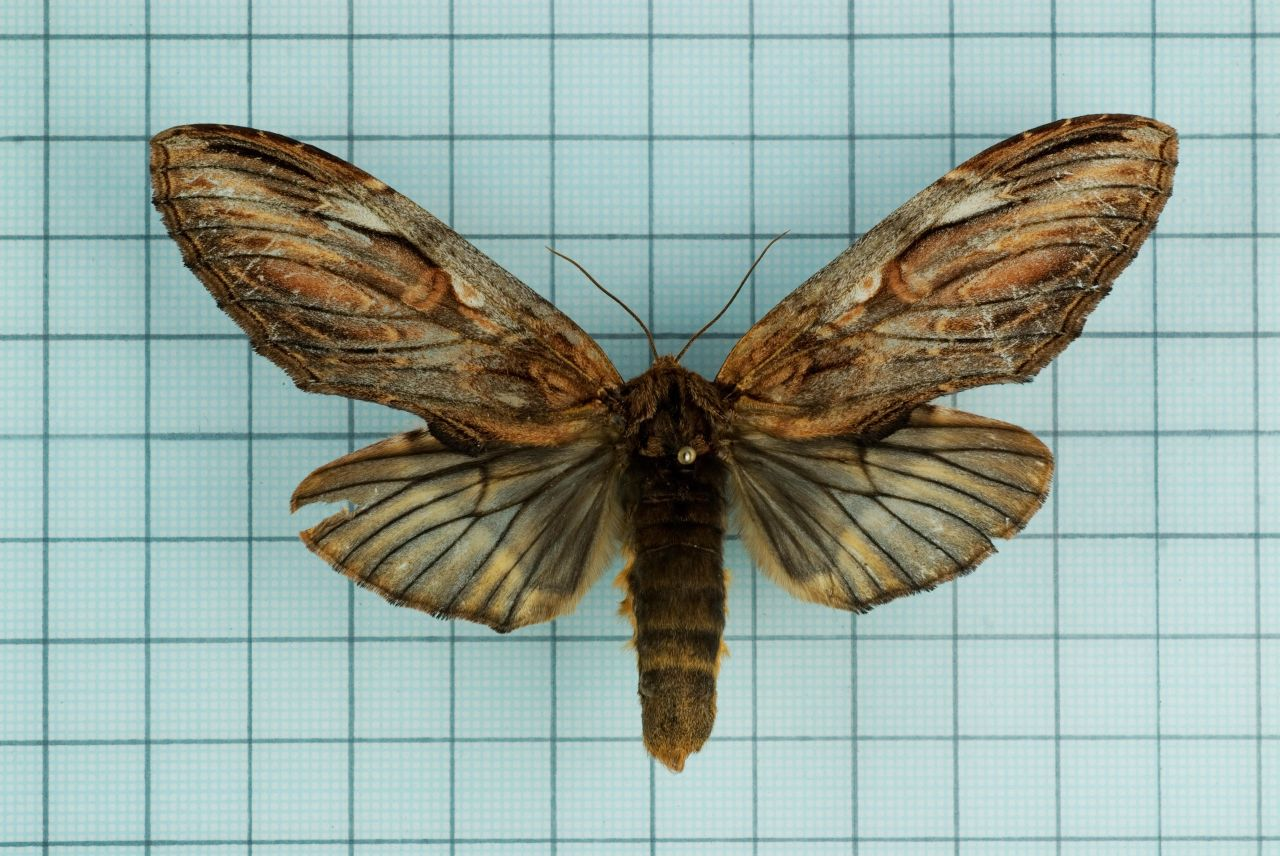

Scientific classification
- Domain: Eukaryota
- Kingdom: Animalia
- Phylum: Arthropoda
- Class: Insecta
- Order: Lepidoptera
- Superfamily: Noctuoidea
- Family: Notodontidae
- Genus: Acmeshachia
- Species: A. gigantea

Binomial name
- Acmeshachia gigantea (Elwes, 1890)

Synonyms
- Notodonta gigantea Elwes, 1890; Acmeshachia takamukui Matsumura, 1929

= Acmeshachia gigantea =

Species of moth

Acmeshachia gigantea is a moth of the family Notodontidae first described by Henry John Elwes in 1890. It is found in Pakistan, north-western India, Nepal, north-eastern India, Myanmar, northern Thailand, south-western China, Taiwan and northern Vietnam.
