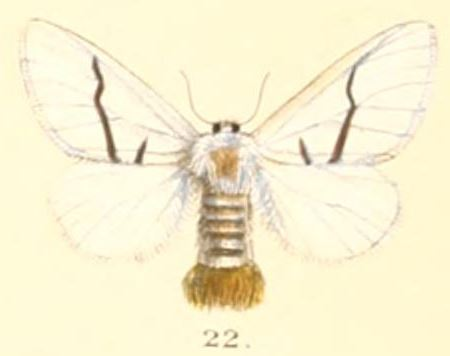

Scientific classification
- Domain: Eukaryota
- Kingdom: Animalia
- Phylum: Arthropoda
- Class: Insecta
- Order: Lepidoptera
- Superfamily: Noctuoidea
- Family: Notodontidae
- Genus: Gazalina
- Species: G. transversa

Binomial name
- Gazalina transversa (Moore, 1879)

Synonyms
- Dasychira transversa Moore, 1879

= Gazalina transversa =

Species of moth

Gazalina transversa is a moth of the family Notodontidae first described by Frederic Moore in 1879. It is found in Sikkim in India and in China.
