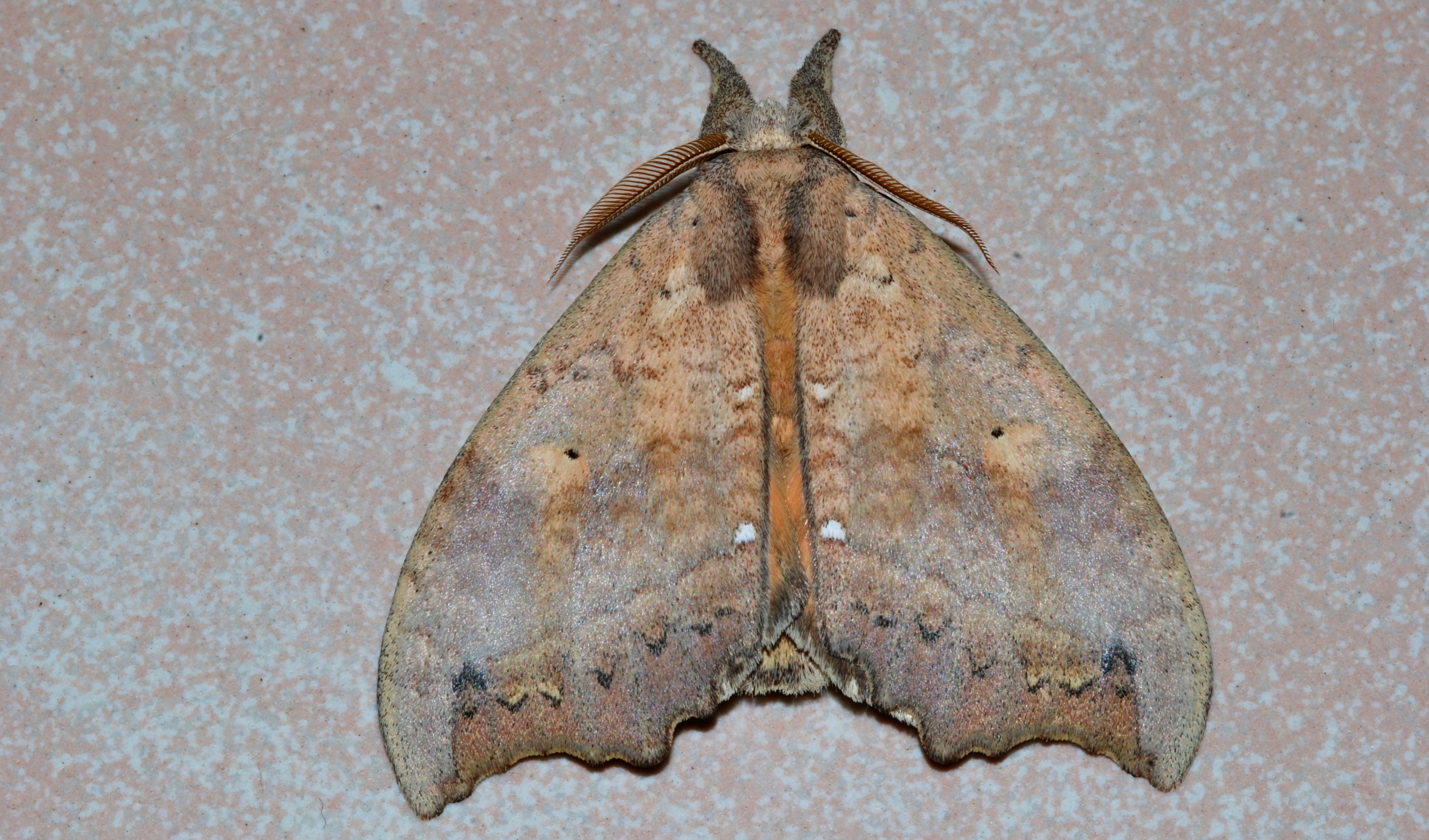
- Gangarides vardena

Scientific classification
- Kingdom: Animalia
- Phylum: Arthropoda
- Class: Insecta
- Order: Lepidoptera
- Superfamily: Noctuoidea
- Family: Notodontidae
- Genus: Gangarides; Moore, [1866]

= Gangarides =

Genus of moths

Gangarides is a genus of moths of the family Notodontidae described by Frederic Moore in 1866.

== Selected species ==
- Gangarides brunneus Schintlmeister, 1994
- Gangarides dharma Moore, [1866]
- Gangarides flavescens Schintlmeister, 1997
- Gangarides gigantea (Druce, 1909)
- Gangarides rosea (Walker, 1865)
- Gangarides rufinus Schintlmeister, 1997
- Gangarides splendidus Schintlmeister, 1994
- Gangarides sugii Schintlmeister, 1993
  - Gangarides sugii negrosanus Kobayashi & Kishida, 2008
  - Gangarides sugii palawanensis Kobayashi & Kishida, 2008
  - Gangarides sugii pulcher Kobayashi & Kishida, 2008
- Gangarides vardena C. Swinhoe, 1892
- Gangarides vittipalpis (Walker, 1869)
- Gangarides wallacei Kobayashi & Kishida, 2008
