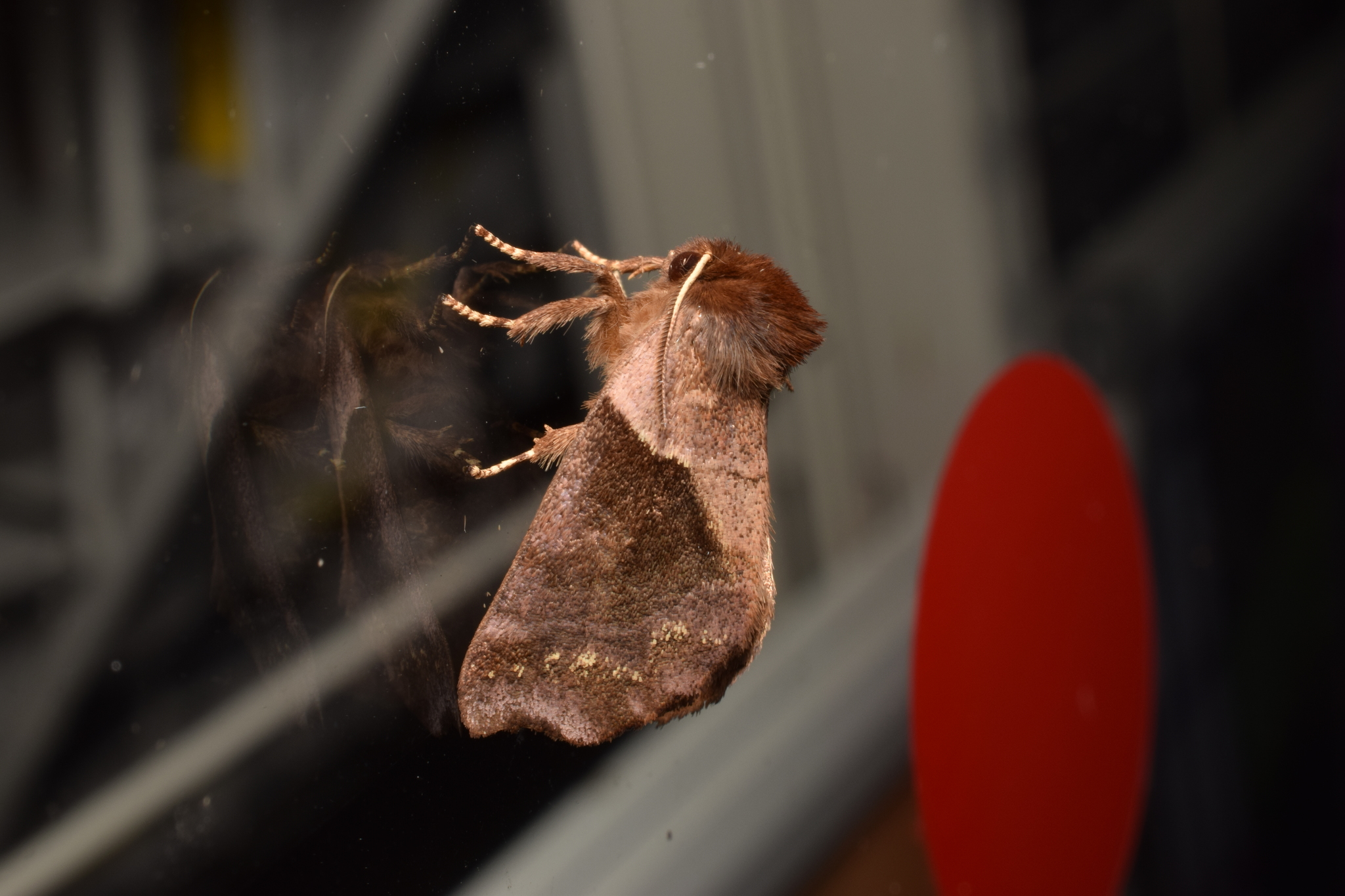
- Gonoclostera timoniorum

Scientific classification
- Domain: Eukaryota
- Kingdom: Animalia
- Phylum: Arthropoda
- Class: Insecta
- Order: Lepidoptera
- Superfamily: Noctuoidea
- Family: Notodontidae
- Genus: Gonoclostera; Butler, 1877

= Gonoclostera =

Genus of moths

Gonoclostera is a genus of moths belonging to the family of Notodontidae.

The different species of this genus are found in Southeastern Asia.

Species:

- Gonoclostera aurosigna Hampson, 1895
- Gonoclostera denticulata Oberthür, 1911
