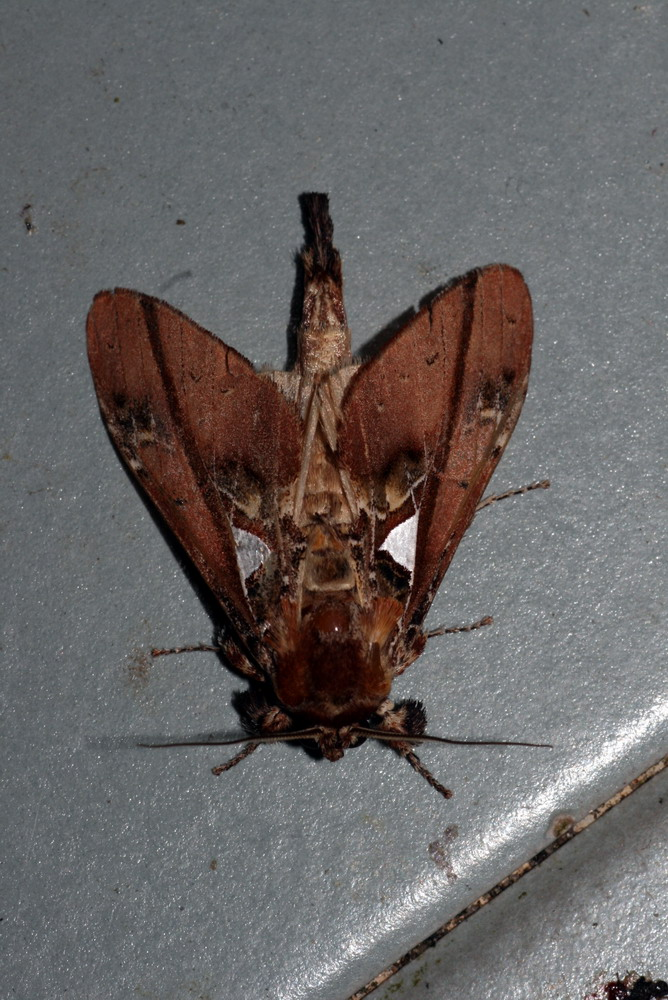

Scientific classification
- Domain: Eukaryota
- Kingdom: Animalia
- Phylum: Arthropoda
- Class: Insecta
- Order: Lepidoptera
- Superfamily: Noctuoidea
- Family: Notodontidae
- Genus: Ginshachia
- Species: G. bronacha

Binomial name
- Ginshachia bronacha (Schaus, 1928)

Synonyms
- Spatalia bronacha Schaus, 1928; Ginshachia gemmifera bronacha Schaus, 1968

= Ginshachia bronacha =

Species of moth

Ginshachia bronacha is a moth of the family Notodontidae. It is found on Java, Thailand, Peninsular Malaysia, Sumatra and Borneo.

== Subspecies ==
- Ginshachia bronacha bronacha (Java, Thailand)
- Ginshachia bronacha aritai (Peninsular Malaysia, Sumatra, Borneo)
