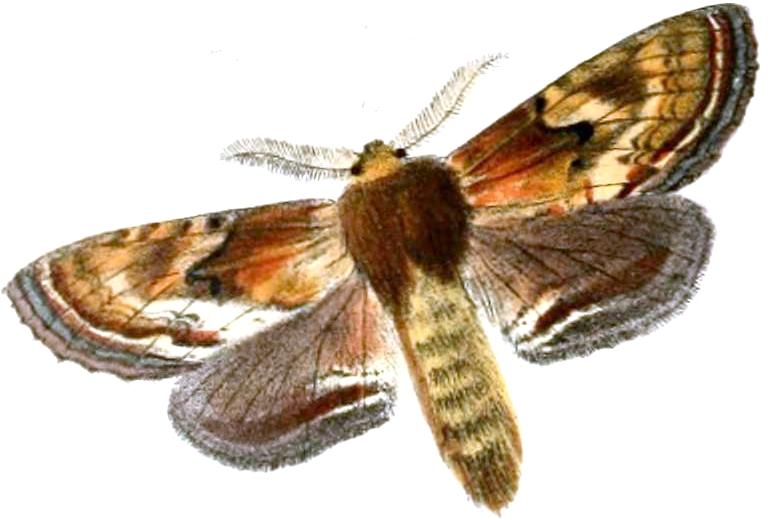

Scientific classification
- Kingdom: Animalia
- Phylum: Arthropoda
- Clade: Pancrustacea
- Class: Insecta
- Order: Lepidoptera
- Superfamily: Noctuoidea
- Family: Notodontidae
- Genus: Hupodonta
- Species: H. pulcherrima

Binomial name
- Hupodonta pulcherrima (Moore, [1866])

Synonyms
- Anodonta pulcherrima Moore, [1866]; Pheosia pulcherrima

= Hupodonta pulcherrima =

Species of moth

Hupodonta pulcherrima is a species of moth of the family Notodontidae first described by Frederic Moore in 1866. It is found in the Indian state of Sikkim and the Chinese provinces of Yunnan and Tibet.
