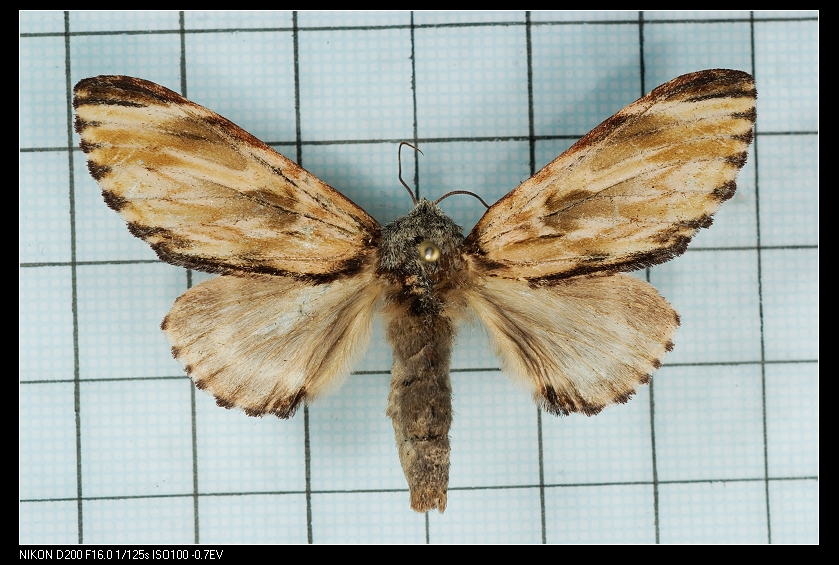

Scientific classification
- Kingdom: Animalia
- Phylum: Arthropoda
- Clade: Pancrustacea
- Class: Insecta
- Order: Lepidoptera
- Superfamily: Noctuoidea
- Family: Notodontidae
- Genus: Neopheosia; Matsumura, 1920
- Species: N. fasciata

Binomial name
- Neopheosia fasciata (Moore, 1888)

Synonyms
- Pheosia fasciata Moore, 1888; Neopheosia fasciata formosana Okano, 1959

= Neopheosia =

Genus of moths

Neopheosia is a monotypic moth genus of the family Notodontidae described by Shōnen Matsumura in 1920. Its only species, Neopheosia fasciata, was first described by Frederic Moore in 1888. It is found in the Himalayas, Taiwan, Sundaland, Buru and Japan.

The wingspan is 45–50 mm.

== Subspecies ==
- Neopheosia fasciata fasciata
- Neopheosia fasciata japonica Okano, 1955 (Japan)
