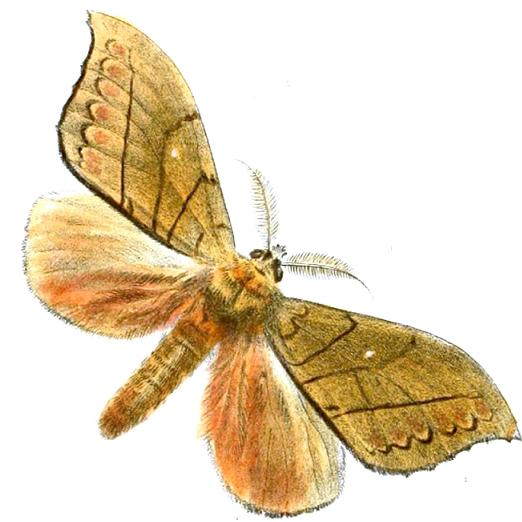

Scientific classification
- Kingdom: Animalia
- Phylum: Arthropoda
- Clade: Pancrustacea
- Class: Insecta
- Order: Lepidoptera
- Superfamily: Noctuoidea
- Family: Notodontidae
- Genus: Gangarides
- Species: G. dharma

Binomial name
- Gangarides dharma Moore, 1866

Synonyms
- Gangarides puerariae Mell, 1922; Gangarides pueraria rubens Matsumura, 1930; Gangarides dharma puerariae Mell, 1922

= Gangarides dharma =

Species of moth

Gangarides dharma is a species of moth of the family Notodontidae. It is found in Nepal, north-eastern India, Myanmar, Thailand, China, Indochina and South Korea.

== Subspecies ==
- Gangarides dharma dharma
- Gangarides dharma coreanus Matsumura, 1924
