= Stauropus dentilinea =

Scientific classification
- Kingdom: Animalia
- Phylum: Arthropoda
- Class: Insecta
- Order: Lepidoptera
- Superfamily: Noctuoidea
- Family: Notodontidae
- Genus: Stauropus
- Species: S. dentilinea

Binomial name
- Stauropus dentilinea Hampson

Species of moth

Stauropus dentilinea, the lobster moth, is a moth of the family Notodontidae. It is found in India and Sri Lanka.
