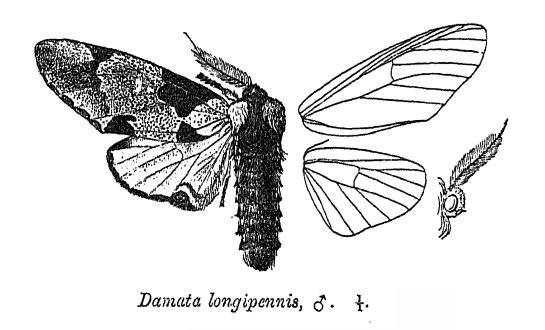
- Harpyia longipennis longipennis

Scientific classification
- Kingdom: Animalia
- Phylum: Arthropoda
- Class: Insecta
- Order: Lepidoptera
- Superfamily: Noctuoidea
- Family: Notodontidae
- Genus: Harpyia
- Species: H. longipennis

Binomial name
- Harpyia longipennis (Walker, 1855)

Synonyms
- Damata longipennis

= Harpyia longipennis =

Species of moth

Harpyia longipennis is a moth in the family Notodontidae. It is found in south-east Asia, including India and Thailand.

== Subspecies ==
- Harpyia longipennis longipennis
- Harpyia longipennis yunnanensis Schintlmeister & Fang, 2001 (Yunnan)
