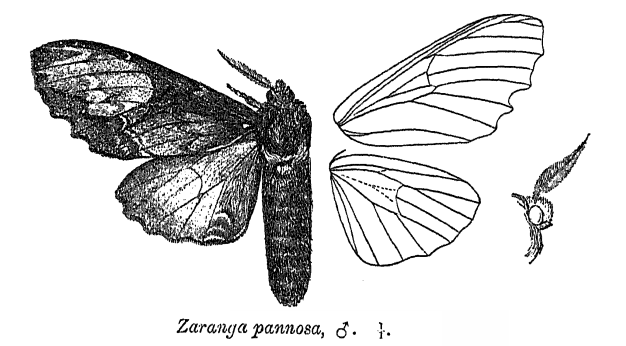

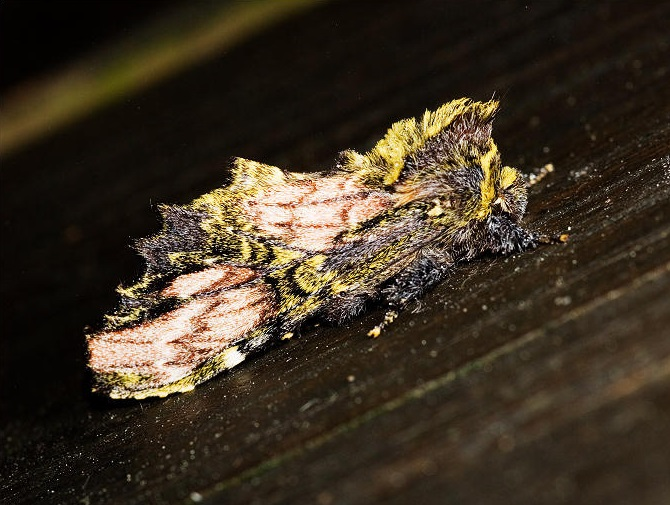

Scientific classification
- Kingdom: Animalia
- Phylum: Arthropoda
- Class: Insecta
- Order: Lepidoptera
- Superfamily: Noctuoidea
- Family: Notodontidae
- Genus: Zaranga
- Species: Z. pannosa

Binomial name
- Zaranga pannosa Moore, 1884

= Zaranga pannosa =

Species of moth

Zaranga pannosa is a moth of the family Notodontidae first described by Frederic Moore in 1884. It is found in Asian countries including India, Nepal, Pakistan, China, Taiwan and Japan.

The wingspan is 52–70 mm.

== Subspecies ==
- Zaranga pannosa necopinatus
- Zaranga pannosa pannosa
