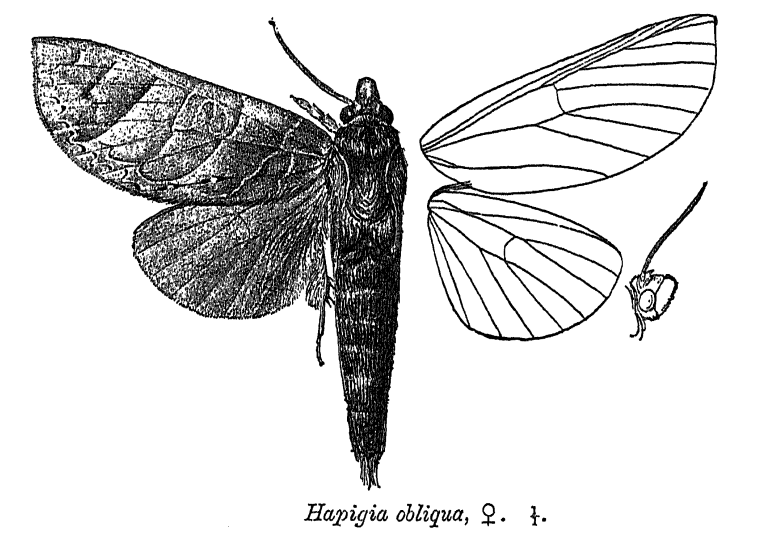

Scientific classification
- Kingdom: Animalia
- Phylum: Arthropoda
- Clade: Pancrustacea
- Class: Insecta
- Order: Lepidoptera
- Superfamily: Noctuoidea
- Family: Notodontidae
- Genus: Hapigia
- Species: H. obliqua

Binomial name
- Hapigia obliqua (Walker, 1875)

= Hapigia obliqua =

Species of moth

Hapigia obliqua is a species of moth in the family Notodontidae.
