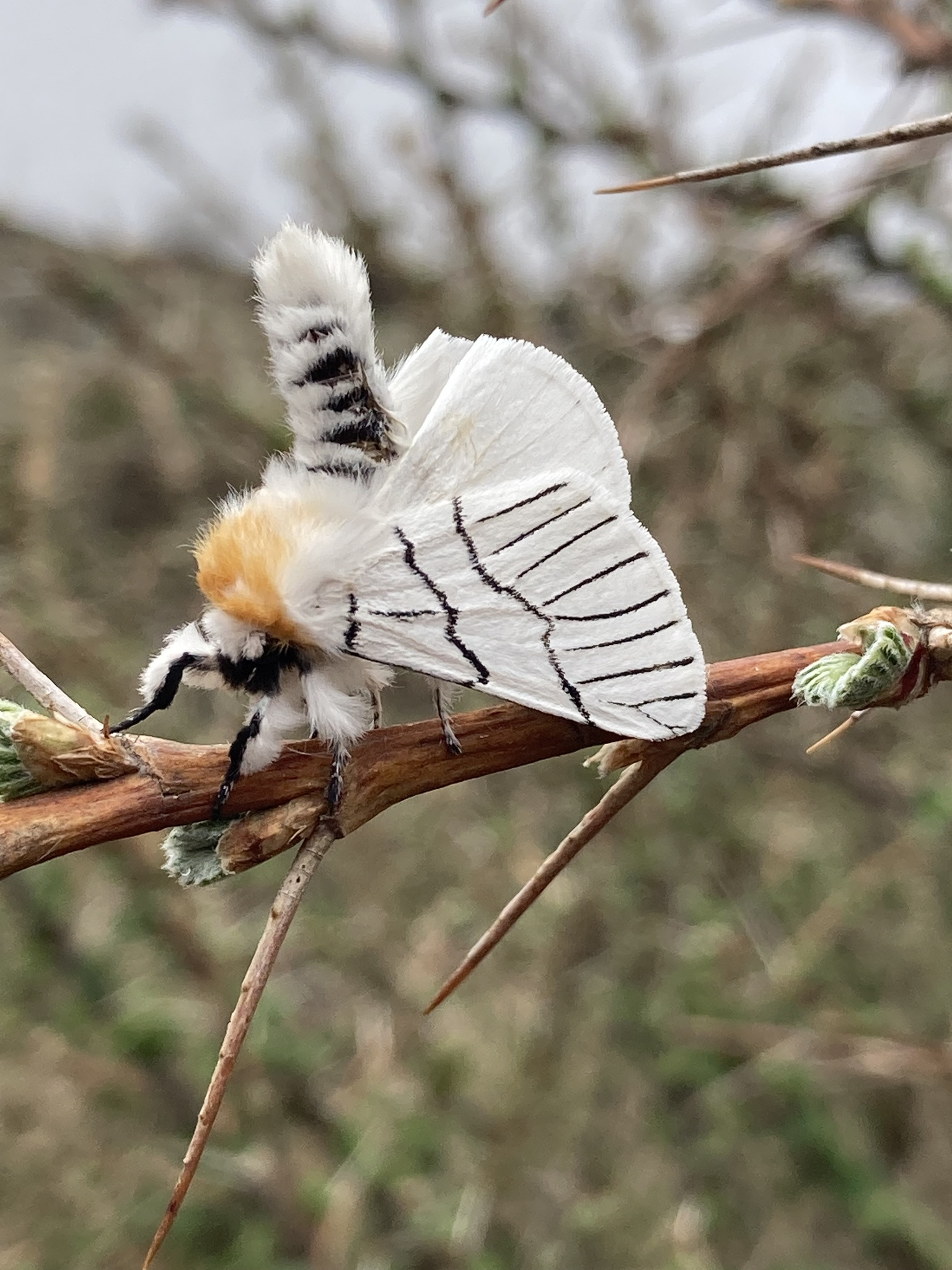
- Gazalina chrysolopha

Scientific classification
- Kingdom: Animalia
- Phylum: Arthropoda
- Class: Insecta
- Order: Lepidoptera
- Superfamily: Noctuoidea
- Family: Notodontidae
- Subfamily: Thaumetopoeinae
- Genus: Gazalina; Walker, 1865

Type species
- Gazalina venosata Walker, 1865

Synonyms
- Oligoclona Felder, 1874; Ansonia Kiriakoff, 1967 (preocc.)

= Gazalina =

Genus of moths

Gazalina is a genus of moths in the family Notodontidae. The genus was erected by Francis Walker in 1865.

In Nepal, Gazalina moths are suspected to be involved in the etiology of the enigmatic eye disease seasonal hyperacute panuveitis.

== Species ==
- Gazalina apsara (Moore, 1859) (India/China)
- Gazalina chrysolopha (Kollar, [1844]) (Nepal/Bhutan)
- Gazalina intermixta Swinhoe, 1900
- Gazalina purificata Sugi, 1993 (Taiwan)
- Gazalina transversa (Moore, 1879) (China/India)
- Gazalina venosata Walker 1865
