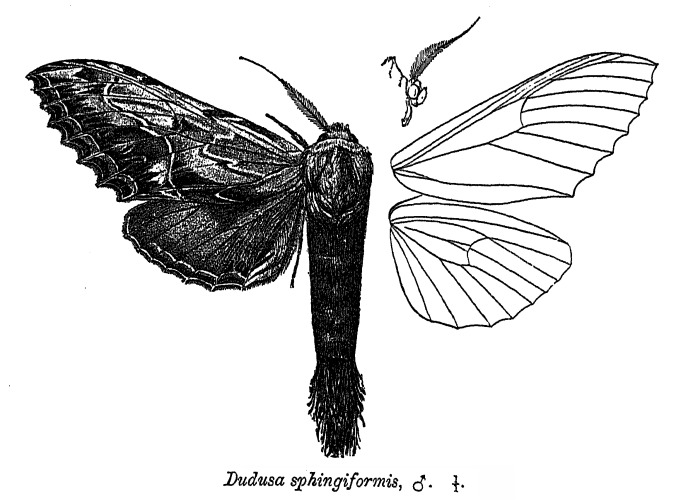

Scientific classification
- Kingdom: Animalia
- Phylum: Arthropoda
- Class: Insecta
- Order: Lepidoptera
- Superfamily: Noctuoidea
- Family: Notodontidae
- Genus: Dudusa
- Species: D. sphingiformis

Binomial name
- Dudusa sphingiformis Moore, 1872

Synonyms
- Dudusa sphingiformis birmana Bryk, 1949; Dudusa sphingiformis coreana Nakatomi, 1977; Dudusa sphingiformis tsushimana Nakamura, 1978

= Dudusa sphingiformis =

Species of moth

Dudusa sphingiformis is a moth of the family Notodontidae. It is found in Asia, including India, Burma, Korea and Japan.

Adults are on wing from May to August.
