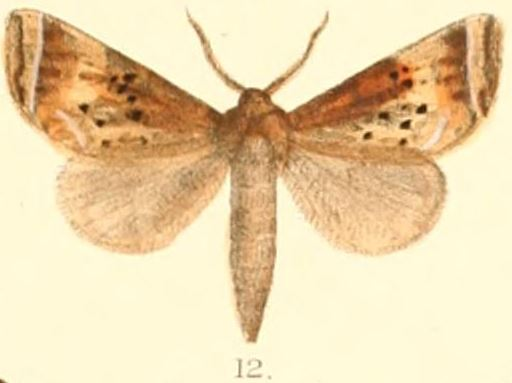

Scientific classification
- Kingdom: Animalia
- Phylum: Arthropoda
- Clade: Pancrustacea
- Class: Insecta
- Order: Lepidoptera
- Superfamily: Noctuoidea
- Family: Notodontidae
- Genus: Neodrymonia
- Species: N. apicalis

Binomial name
- Neodrymonia apicalis (Moore, 1879)

Synonyms
- Ramesa apicalis Moore, 1879; Nepalia vesperalis Nakamura, 1974

= Neodrymonia apicalis =

Species of moth

Neodrymonia apicalis is a moth of the family Notodontidae first described by Frederic Moore in 1879.

== Distribution ==
It is found in China, Vietnam, India and in Nepal.
