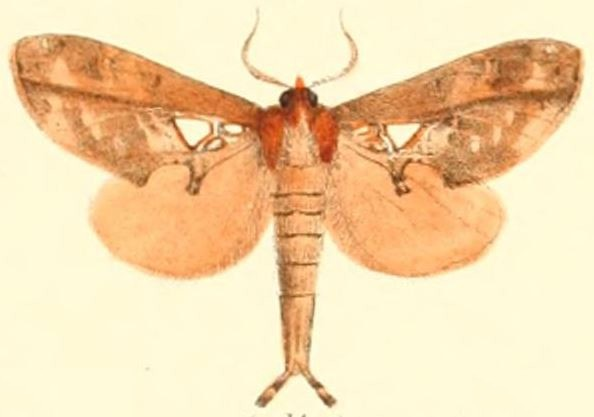

Scientific classification
- Domain: Eukaryota
- Kingdom: Animalia
- Phylum: Arthropoda
- Class: Insecta
- Order: Lepidoptera
- Superfamily: Noctuoidea
- Family: Notodontidae
- Genus: Ginshachia
- Species: G. gemmifera

Binomial name
- Ginshachia gemmifera (Moore, 1877)

Synonyms
- Spatalia gemmifera Moore, 1879

= Ginshachia gemmifera =

Species of moth

Ginshachia gemmifera is a moth of the family Notodontidae. It is found in India.
