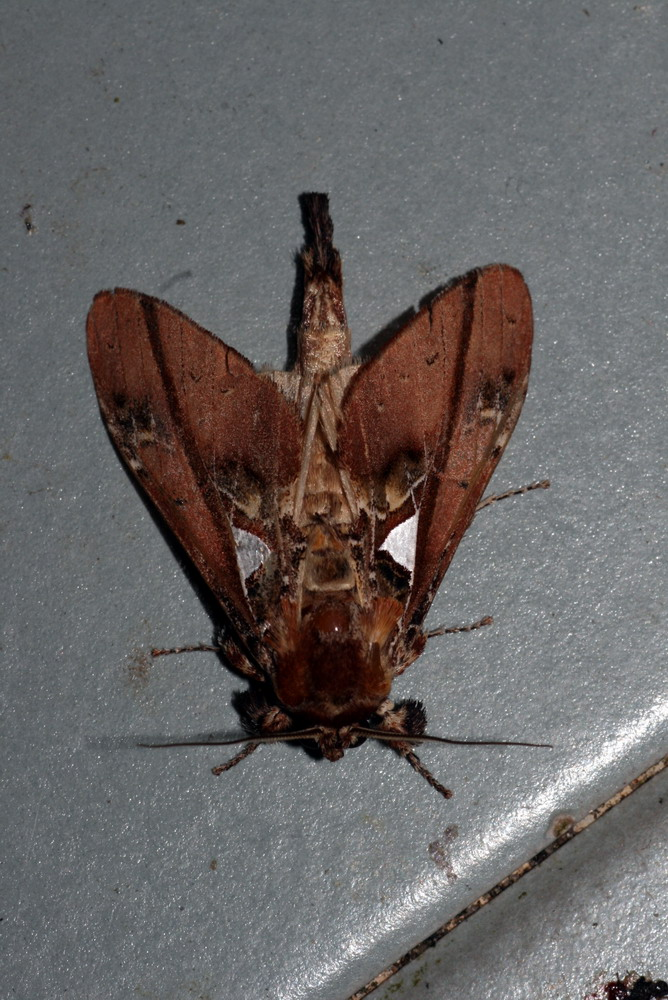
- Ginshachia bronacha, male (Notodontidae)

Scientific classification
- Kingdom: Animalia
- Phylum: Arthropoda
- Clade: Pancrustacea
- Class: Insecta
- Order: Lepidoptera
- Superfamily: Noctuoidea
- Family: Notodontidae
- Genus: Ginshachia; Matsumura, 1929

= Ginshachia =

Genus of moths

Ginshachia is a genus of moths belonging to the family Notodontidae.

The species of this genus are found in Southeastern Asia.

Species:

- Ginshachia aritai Nakamura, 1976
- Ginshachia baenzigeri Schintlmeister, 2007
- Ginshachia bronacha (Schaus, 1928)
- Ginshachia gemmifera (Moore, 1879)
