= Alatanadata =

Scientific classification
- Kingdom: Animalia
- Phylum: Arthropoda
- Clade: Pancrustacea
- Class: Insecta
- Order: Lepidoptera
- Superfamily: Noctuoidea
- Family: Notodontidae
- Subfamily: Notodontinae
- Genus: Alatanadata; Strand, 1912
- Species: A. latipennis

Binomial name
- Alatanadata latipennis Strand, 1912

Genus of moths

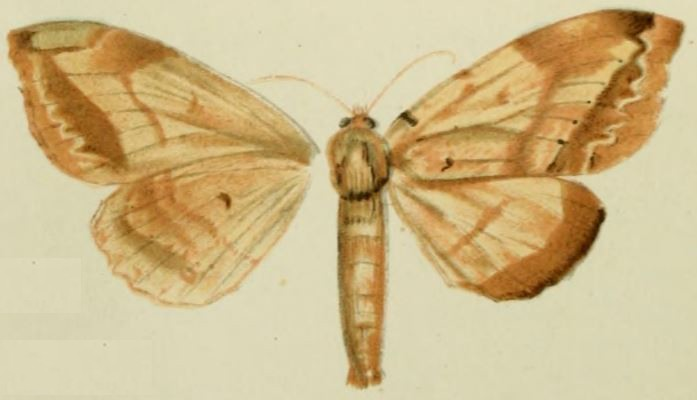

Alatanadata is a monotypic genus of moths in the family of Notodontidae. Its only species, Alatanadata latipennis, is found in Cameroon. Both the genus and species were first described by Embrik Strand in 1912.
