= Urgedra =

Scientific classification
- Kingdom: Animalia
- Phylum: Arthropoda
- Clade: Pancrustacea
- Class: Insecta
- Order: Lepidoptera
- Superfamily: Noctuoidea
- Family: Notodontidae
- Subfamily: Notodontinae
- Genus: Urgedra; Dyar, 1908

Genus of moths

Urgedra is a genus of moths of the family Notodontidae. The genus contains about 20 described species occurring from Colombia south to Bolivia.

== Selected species ==
- Urgedra chlorolepis Miller & Thiaucourt, 2011
- Urgedra deserta Miller & Thiaucourt, 2011
- Urgedra janzeni Miller & Thiaucourt, 2011
- Urgedra pavimenta Dognin, 1910
- Urgedra quindinata Dognin, 1910
- Urgedra striata (Druce, 1906)
- Urgedra viridiflava Dognin, 1911
