= Urgedra pavimenta =

Scientific classification
- Kingdom: Animalia
- Phylum: Arthropoda
- Clade: Pancrustacea
- Class: Insecta
- Order: Lepidoptera
- Superfamily: Noctuoidea
- Family: Notodontidae
- Genus: Urgedra
- Species: U. pavimenta

Binomial name
- Urgedra pavimenta Dognin, 1910

Species of moth

Urgedra pavimenta is a species of moth in the family Notodontidae. It was first described by the French entomologist Paul Dognin in 1910. The species is known to occur in central Colombia, where it inhabits montane and cloud forest regions.

== Taxonomy ==
Gaede treated it as a synonym of Urgedra striata in 1934, but it was resurrected to full species status in 2011.
