= N. bidentata =

N. bidentata may refer to:

- Naesa bidentata, an isopod crustacean
- Nerice bidentata, a North American moth
