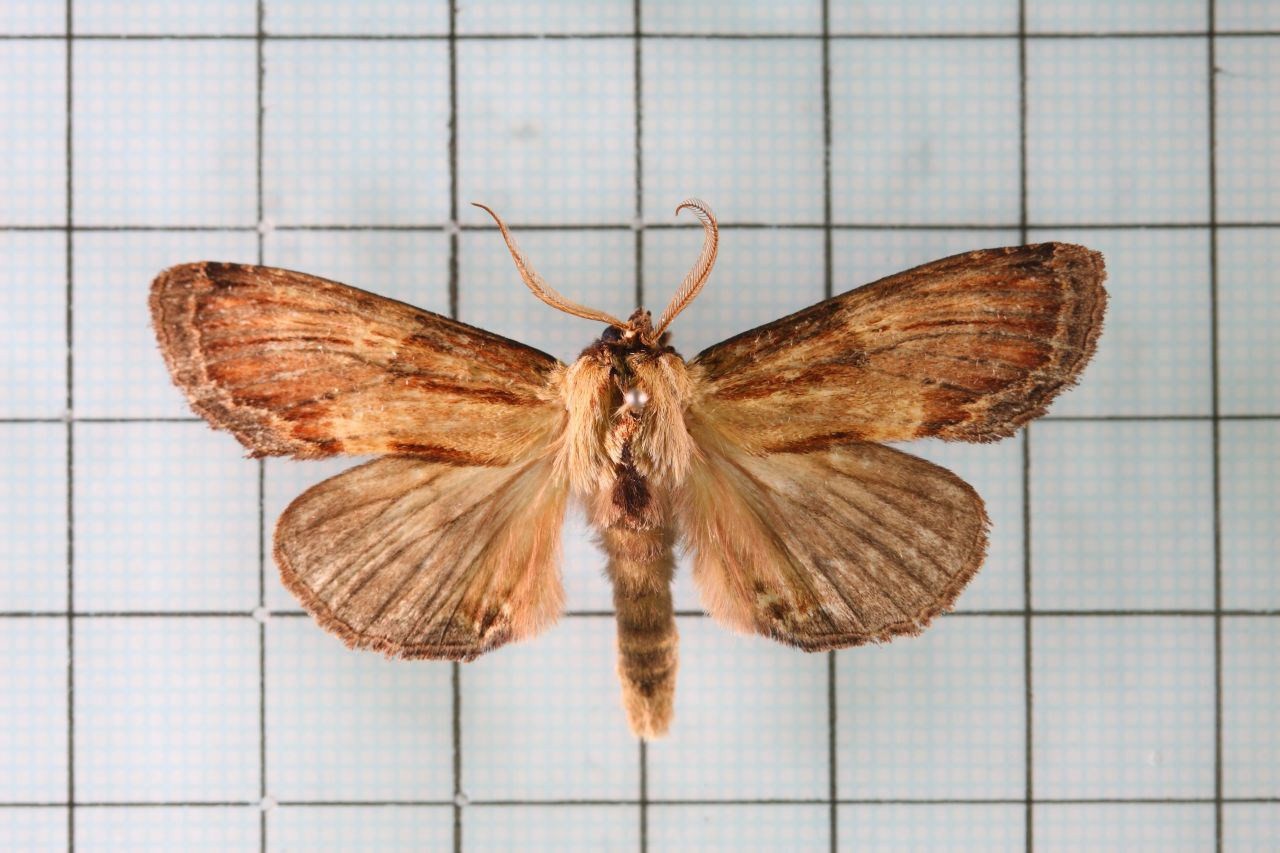
- Fentonia macroparabolica

Scientific classification
- Kingdom: Animalia
- Phylum: Arthropoda
- Clade: Pancrustacea
- Class: Insecta
- Order: Lepidoptera
- Superfamily: Noctuoidea
- Family: Notodontidae
- Subfamily: Notodontinae
- Genus: Fentonia; Butler, 1881

Synonyms
- Urocampa Staudinger, 1892; Neoshachia Matsumura, 1925

= Fentonia =

Genus of moths

Fentonia is a genus of moths of the family Notodontidae erected by Arthur Gardiner Butler in 1881.

== Species ==
- Fentonia baibarana Matsumura, 1929
- Fentonia bipunctus (Rothschild, 1917)
- Fentonia excurvata (Hampson, [1893])
- Fentonia helena Kiriakoff, 1974
- Fentonia macroparabolica Nakamura, 1973
- Fentonia notodontina (Rothschild, 1917)
- Fentonia ocypete (Bremer, 1861)
- Fentonia parabolica (Matsumura, 1925)
- Fentonia shenghua Schintlmeister & Fang, 2001
- Fentonia sumatrana Kiriakoff, 1974
- Fentonia talboti (Gaede, 1930)
