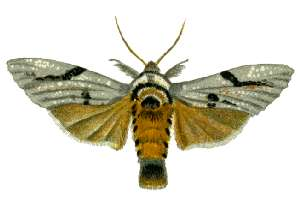

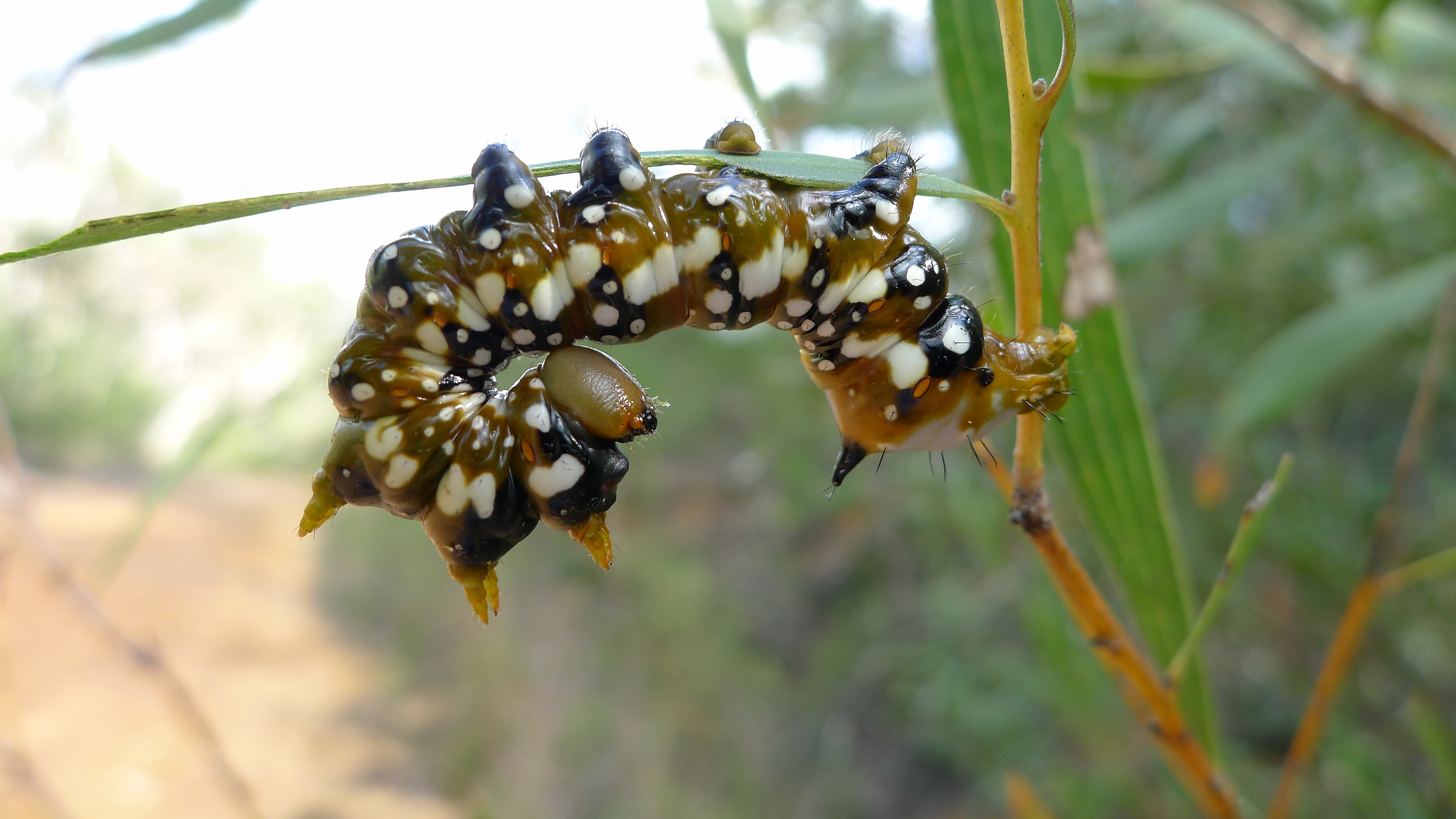

Scientific classification
- Kingdom: Animalia
- Phylum: Arthropoda
- Clade: Pancrustacea
- Class: Insecta
- Order: Lepidoptera
- Superfamily: Noctuoidea
- Family: Notodontidae
- Subfamily: Notodontinae
- Genus: Psalidostetha; Swainson, 1851
- Species: P. banksiae

Binomial name
- Psalidostetha banksiae (Lewin, 1805)

Synonyms
- Bombyx banksiae Lewin, 1805; Danima banksiae (Lewin, 1805)

= Psalidostetha =

Species of moth

Psalidostetha banksiae, also known as the banksia moth, is a moth of the family Notodontidae. It is found throughout Australia. Its wingspan is about 6 cm (2.4 in). It is the only species in the genus Psalidostetha.

The larvae feed on Banksia, Hakea, Dryandra and Grevillea leaves.
