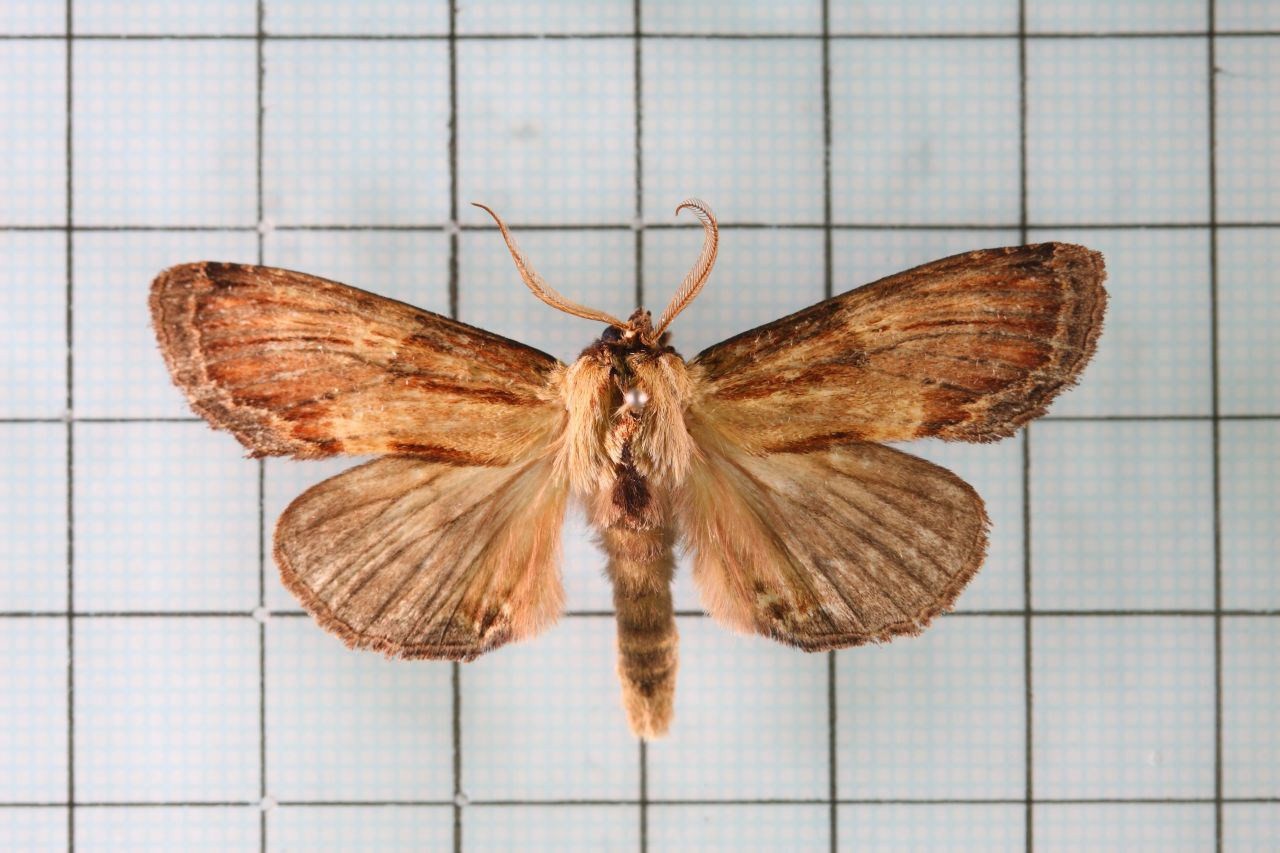

Scientific classification
- Kingdom: Animalia
- Phylum: Arthropoda
- Clade: Pancrustacea
- Class: Insecta
- Order: Lepidoptera
- Superfamily: Noctuoidea
- Family: Notodontidae
- Genus: Fentonia
- Species: F. macroparabolica

Binomial name
- Fentonia macroparabolica Nakamura, 1973

= Fentonia macroparabolica =

Species of moth

Fentonia macroparabolica is a moth in the family Notodontidae. It is found in Taiwan.

The wingspan is 47–55 mm.
