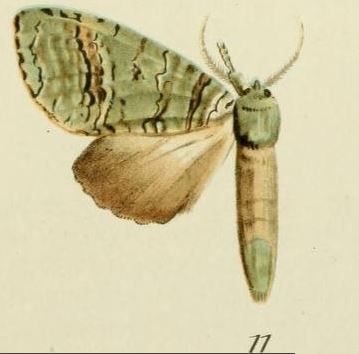

Scientific classification
- Kingdom: Animalia
- Phylum: Arthropoda
- Clade: Pancrustacea
- Class: Insecta
- Order: Lepidoptera
- Superfamily: Noctuoidea
- Family: Notodontidae
- Subfamily: Notodontinae
- Genus: Someropsis; Strand, 1912
- Species: S. viriditincta

Binomial name
- Someropsis viriditincta Strand, 1912

= Someropsis =

Genus of moths

Someropsis is a monotypic genus of moths in the family of Notodontidae. Its only species, Someropsis viriditincta, is found in Cameroon, Equatorial Guinea and Ivory Coast. Both the genus and species were first described by Embrik Strand in 1912.
