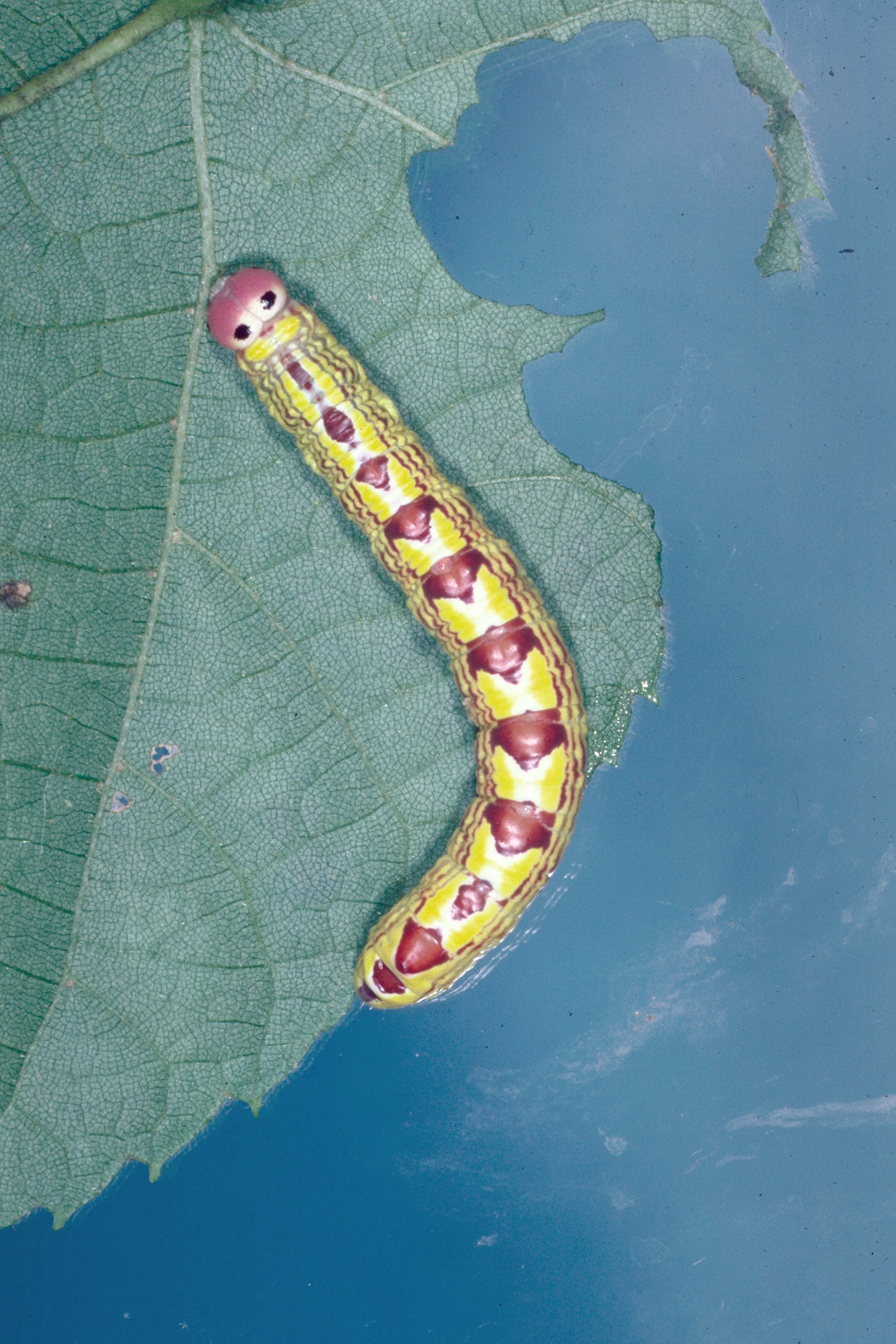
- Ellida Caniplaga

Scientific classification
- Kingdom: Animalia
- Phylum: Arthropoda
- Clade: Pancrustacea
- Class: Insecta
- Order: Lepidoptera
- Superfamily: Noctuoidea
- Family: Notodontidae
- Subfamily: Notodontinae
- Genus: Ellida; Grote, 1876

= Ellida =

Genus of moths

Ellida is a genus of moths of the family Notodontidae erected by Augustus Radcliffe Grote in 1876.

== Species ==
- Ellida viridimixta (Bremer, 1861)
- Ellida branickii (OberthÜr, 1880)
- Ellida arcuata Alpheraky, 1897
- Ellida ornatrix Schintlmeister & Fang, 2001
- Ellida caniplaga (Walker, 1856)
