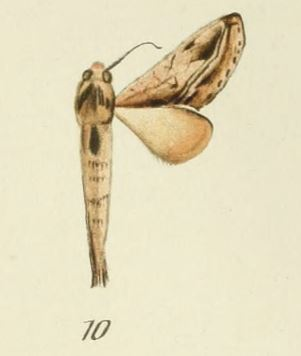

Scientific classification
- Kingdom: Animalia
- Phylum: Arthropoda
- Clade: Pancrustacea
- Class: Insecta
- Order: Lepidoptera
- Superfamily: Noctuoidea
- Family: Notodontidae
- Genus: Scalmicauda
- Species: S. tessmanni

Binomial name
- Scalmicauda tessmanni (Strand, 1911)

Synonyms
- Graphidura tessmanni Strand, 1911; Scalmicauda biarculinea Bethune-Baker, 1927

= Scalmicauda tessmanni =

Species of moth

Scalmicauda tessmanni is a moth in the family of Notodontidae first described by Embrik Strand in 1911. It is found in Cameroon, the Democratic Republic of the Congo, Equatorial Guinea Gabon, Malawi, South Africa and Ivory Coast.

The wingspan is about 40 mm. The forewings are pinkish tawny, becoming paler and pinker towards the termen. There is a trace of a fine excurved and recurred subbasal line and there is a pair of fine, curved, parallel dark lines from just in front of the apex on the costa to beyond the middle of the inner margin. The interspace is filled with grey. In the middle of the pinkish posterior area is an indefinite band of pale golden brown, on the exterior edge of which is an interneural series of fine dark lunules. The hindwings are pale brownish.
