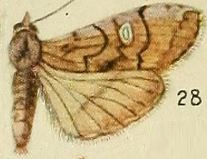
- Scrancia amata

Scientific classification
- Kingdom: Animalia
- Phylum: Arthropoda
- Clade: Pancrustacea
- Class: Insecta
- Order: Lepidoptera
- Superfamily: Noctuoidea
- Family: Notodontidae
- Subfamily: Notodontinae
- Genus: Scrancia; Holland, 1893

Type species
- Scrancia modesta Holland, 1893

= Scrancia =

Genus of moths

Scrancia is a genus of moths in the family of Notodontidae erected by William Jacob Holland in 1893. The species are known from the Afrotropics.

== Species ==
Some species of this genus are:

- Scrancia amata Fawcett, 1916
- Scrancia accipiter (Schaus & Clements, 1893)
- Scrancia africana Aurivillius
- Scrancia albidorsa Gaede, 1930
- Scrancia albiplaga (Gaede, 1928)
- Scrancia aesalon Kiriakoff, 1967
- Scrancia agrostes Kiriakoff, 1962
- Scrancia angustissima Kiriakoff, 1962
- Scrancia astur Kiriakoff, 1962
- Scrancia arcuata Kiriakoff, 1962
- Scrancia argyrochroa Kiriakoff, 1962
- Scrancia atribasalis Kiriakoff, 1967
- Scrancia atrifasciata Gaede, 1928
- Scrancia atrifrons Hampson, 1910
- Scrancia accipites (Schaus, 1893)
- Scrancia brunnescens Gaede, 1928
- Scrancia buteo Kiriakoff, 1968
- Scrancia cadoreli Viette, 1972
- Scrancia corticalis Kiriakoff, 1965
- Scrancia cupreitincta Kiriakoff, 1962
- Scrancia danieli Kiriakoff, 1962
- Scrancia discomma Jordan, 1916
- Scrancia dryotriorchis Kiriakoff, 1968
- Scrancia elanus Kiriakoff, 1971
- Scrancia erythrops Kiriakoff, 1962
- Scrancia expleta Kiriakoff, 1962
- Scrancia discomma Jordan, 1916
- Scrancia galactopera Kiriakoff, 1962
- Scrancia galactoperoides Kiriakoff, 1970
- Scranciola habilis Kiriakoff, 1965
- Scrancia hypotriorchis Kiriakoff, 1967
- Scrancia ioptila (Viette, 1955)
- Scrancia lactea Gaede, 1928
- Scrancia leucosparsa Kiriakoff, 1964
- Scrancia leucopera Hampson, 1910
- Scrancia margaritacea Gaede, 1928
- Scrancia melierax Kiriakoff, 1965
- Scrancia milvus Kiriakoff, 1971
- Scrancia modesta Holland, 1893
- Scrancia nisus Kiriakoff, 1967
- Scrancia oculata Kiriakoff, 1962
- Scrancia osica Kiriakoff, 1967
- Scrancia paucinotata Kiriakoff, 1962
- Scrancia piperita Kiriakoff, 1962
- Scrancia polyphemus Kiriakoff, 1962
- Scrancia prothoracalis Strand, 1911
- Scrancia pyralina Kiriakoff, 1964
- Scrancia quinquelineata Kiriakoff, 1965
- Scrancia rothschildi Kiriakoff, 1965
- Scrancia rachitica Kiriakoff, 1962
- Scrancia sagittata Gaede, 1928
- Scrancia stictica Hampson, 1910
- Scrancia subrosea Gaede, 1928
- Scrancia subscrancia Kiriakoff, 1970
- Scrancia tephraea (Bethune-Baker, 1911)
- Scrancia tinnunculus Kiriakoff, 1967
- Scrancia tridens Kiriakoff, 1963
- Scrancia tuleara Kiriakoff, 1963
- Scrancia vaga Kiriakoff, 1962
- Scrancia viridis Gaede, 1928
