= Urgedra deserta =

Scientific classification
- Kingdom: Animalia
- Phylum: Arthropoda
- Clade: Pancrustacea
- Class: Insecta
- Order: Lepidoptera
- Superfamily: Noctuoidea
- Family: Notodontidae
- Genus: Urgedra
- Species: U. deserta

Binomial name
- Urgedra deserta Miller & Thiaucourt, 2011

Species of moth

Urgedra deserta is a moth of the family Notodontidae. It is found in north-eastern Ecuador.

The length of the forewings is about 17 mm.
