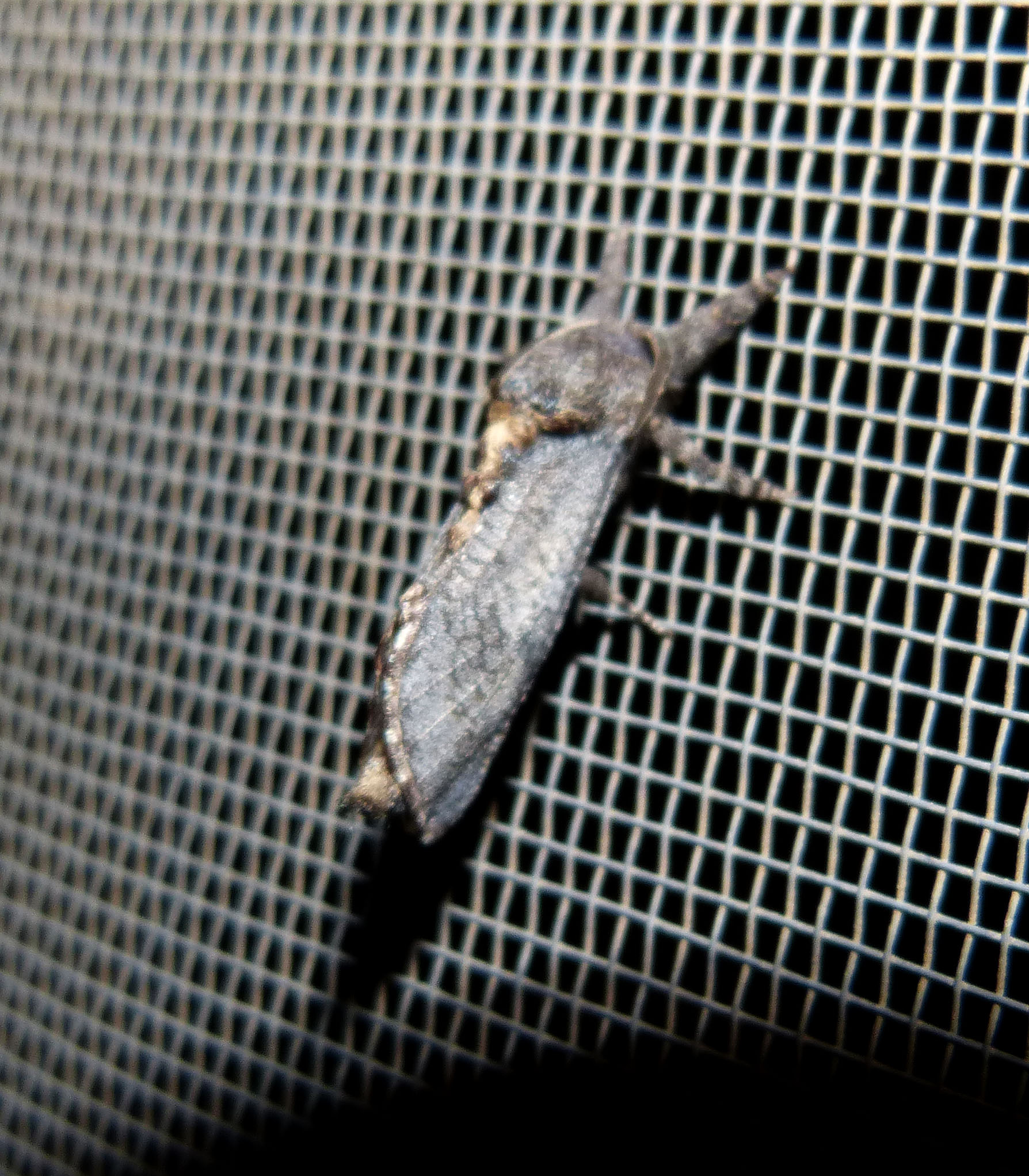

Scientific classification
- Kingdom: Animalia
- Phylum: Arthropoda
- Clade: Pancrustacea
- Class: Insecta
- Order: Lepidoptera
- Superfamily: Noctuoidea
- Family: Notodontidae
- Genus: Odontosia
- Species: O. elegans

Binomial name
- Odontosia elegans (Strecker, 1885)

= Odontosia elegans =

Species of moth

Odontosia elegans, the elegant prominent, is a species of moth in the family Notodontidae (the prominents). It was first described by Herman Strecker in 1885 and it is found in North America.

The MONA or Hodges number for Odontosia elegans is 7924.
