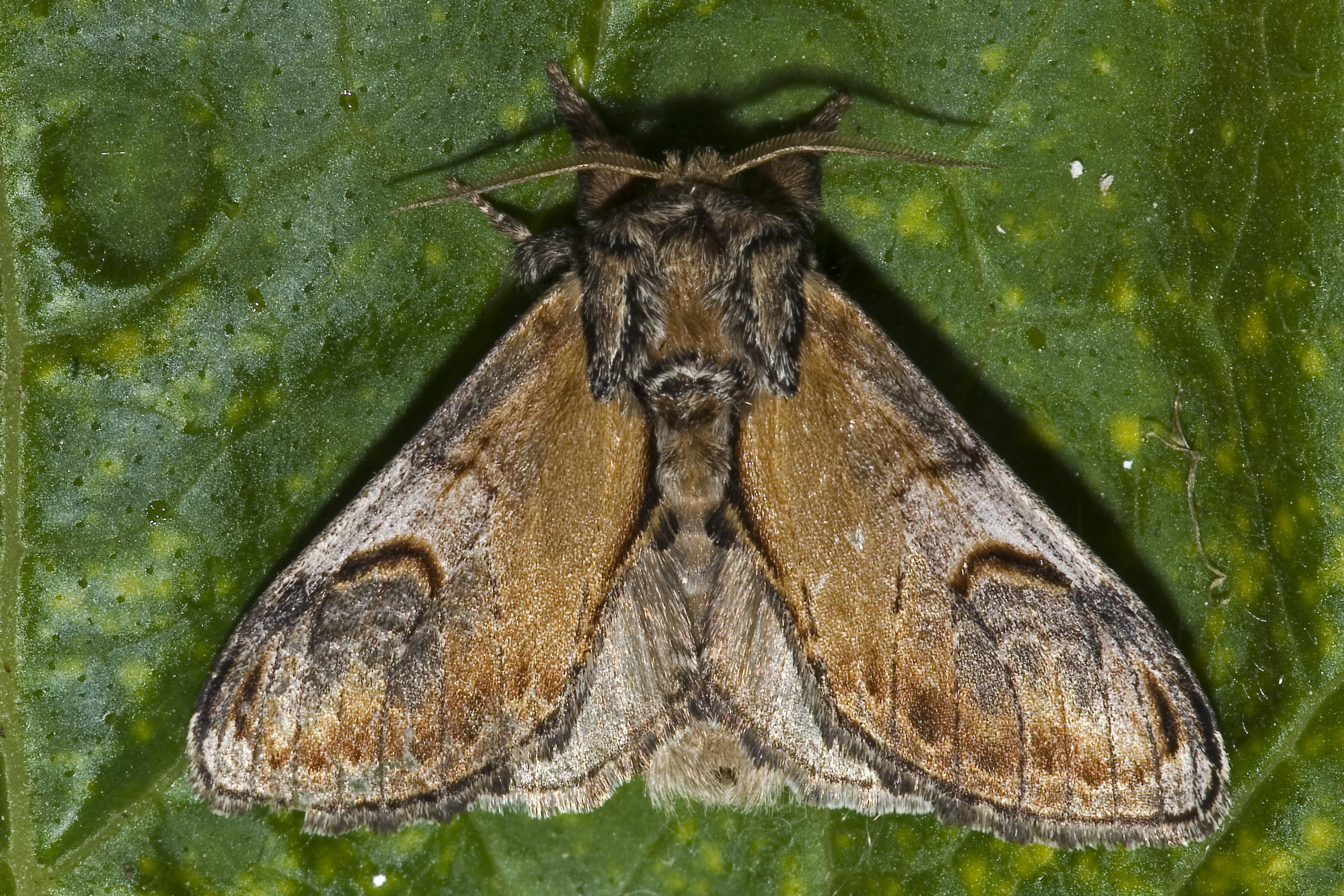
- Pebble prominent, Notodonta ziczac

Scientific classification
- Kingdom: Animalia
- Phylum: Arthropoda
- Clade: Pancrustacea
- Class: Insecta
- Order: Lepidoptera
- Superfamily: Noctuoidea
- Family: Notodontidae
- Subfamily: Notodontinae; Stephens, 1829

Genera
- 30, see text

= Notodontinae =

Subfamily of moths

Notodontinae is the nominate subfamily of the moth family Notodontidae. The Ptilodoninae are sometimes merged herein. The genus list is preliminary, as not all Notodontidae have been assigned to subfamilies yet.

== Genera and some species ==
- Afrocerura
  - Afrocerura cameroona
- Brachychira
- Cerura
- Chadisra
  - Chadisra bipars
- Cleapa
- Drymonia
- Ellida
- Euhampsonia
- Eulavinia
- Fentonia
- Furcula
- Gargettoscrancia
- Homocentridia
- Hupodonta
- Hyperaeschra
- Leucodonta
  - Leucodonta bicoloria
- Lophocosma
- Melagonina
- Mesophalera
- Metriaeschra
- Mimesisomera
- Neodrymonia
  - Neodrymonia apicalis
  - Neodrymonia rufa
- Neola
- Nephodonta
- Nerice
- Norracoides
- Notodonta
- Odontosia
- Odontosiana
- Paranerice
- Peridea
- Periphalera
- Pheosia
- Pheosiopsis
- Psalidostetha
- Pseudofentonia
- Pseudosomera
- Pseudostauropus
- Rachiades
- Scalmicauda
- Scrancia
- Semidonta
- Shaka
- Someropsis
- Sorama
- Stauropussa
- Stemmatophalera
- Uropyia
- Xanthodonta
