= Xanthodonta nigrovittata =

Scientific classification
- Kingdom: Animalia
- Phylum: Arthropoda
- Clade: Pancrustacea
- Class: Insecta
- Order: Lepidoptera
- Superfamily: Noctuoidea
- Family: Notodontidae
- Genus: Xanthodonta
- Species: X. nigrovittata

Binomial name
- Xanthodonta nigrovittata (Aurivilius, 1921)

Synonyms
- Pydna nigrovittata Aurivilius, 1921

Species of moth

Xanthodonta nigrovittata is a moth of the family Notodontidae. It is found in Kenya.

The wingspan is 23–31 mm.
