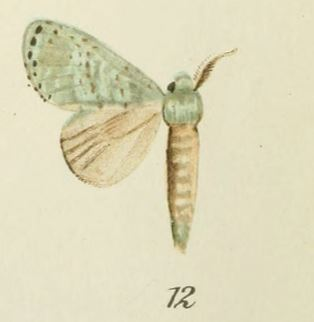

Scientific classification
- Kingdom: Animalia
- Phylum: Arthropoda
- Clade: Pancrustacea
- Class: Insecta
- Order: Lepidoptera
- Superfamily: Noctuoidea
- Family: Notodontidae
- Subfamily: Notodontinae
- Genus: Stauropussa; Strand, 1912
- Species: S. chloe

Binomial name
- Stauropussa chloe (Holland, 1893)

Synonyms
- Somera chloe Holland, 1893; Stauropussa viridipennis Strand, 1912

= Stauropussa =

Genus of moths

Stauropussa is a monotypic moth genus of the family of Notodontidae erected by Embrik Strand in 1912. Its only species, Stauropussa chloe, was first described by William Jacob Holland in 1893. It is found in Cameroon, Democratic Republic of the Congo, Gabon, Guinea, Nigeria, Sierra Leone and Togo.
