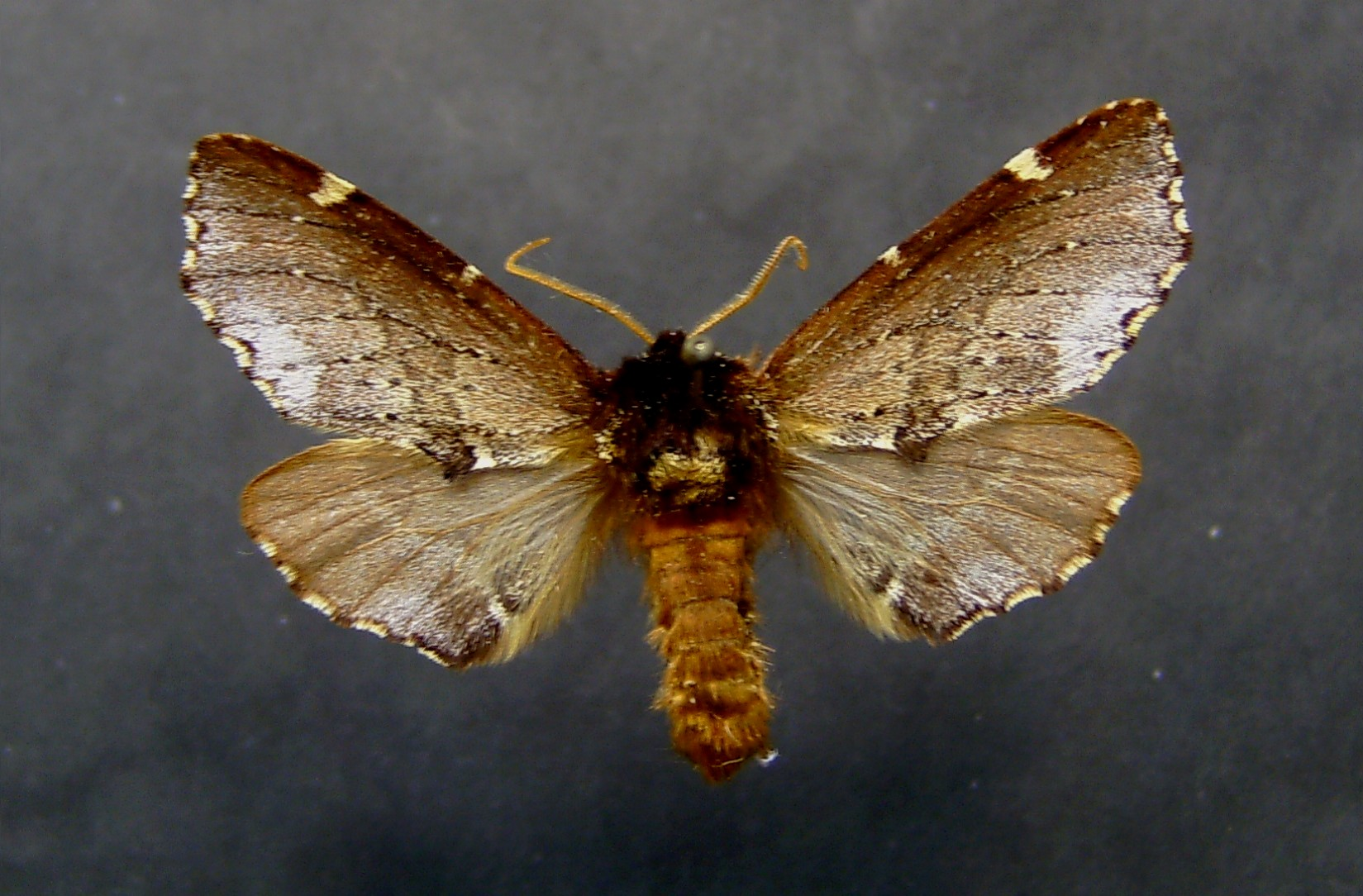

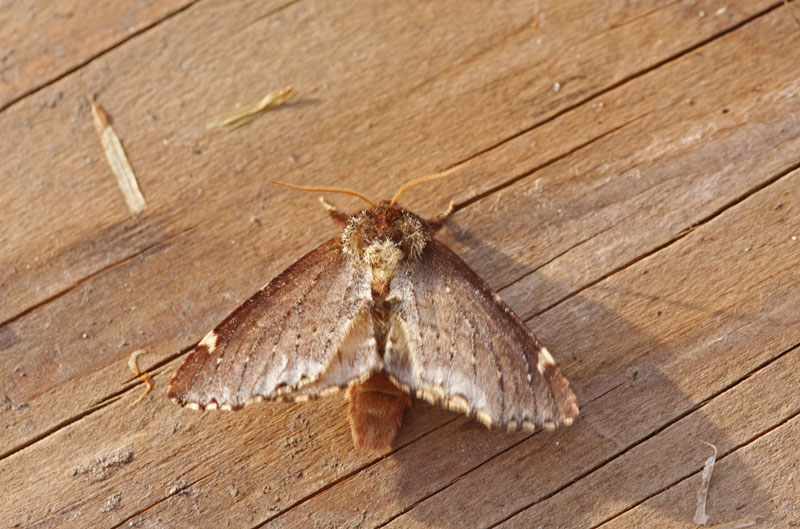

Scientific classification
- Kingdom: Animalia
- Phylum: Arthropoda
- Clade: Pancrustacea
- Class: Insecta
- Order: Lepidoptera
- Superfamily: Noctuoidea
- Family: Notodontidae
- Genus: Odontosia
- Species: O. carmelita

Binomial name
- Odontosia carmelita (Esper, 1798)

= Odontosia carmelita =

Scarce prominent

Species of moth

Odontosia carmelita, the scarce prominent, is a moth of the family Notodontidae. The species was first described by Eugenius Johann Christoph Esper in 1798. It is found in central Europe, ranging to Ireland and Finland in the north and Russia in the east.

The wingspan is 32–42 mm. The wing colour is graded in various shades of reddish brown or purplish grey. The forewings have faint points of paler colour (grey scales) and there is a distinct creamy patch on the front margin. The forewings are scalloped. The hindwing is paler with a dark brown anal patch. The thorax and body are dark brown.

Seitz- Antenna of male only dentate and ciliate. Thorax dark brown, with the hind margin of the patagia grey. Abdomen light brown. Forewing dark brown with a reddish tone, the anterior half darkest, the posterior and outer areas strongly suffused with whitish grey; tooth of scales at hind margin black-brown; costal margin at one-third and again at two-thirds with a white spot as indication of vestigial transverse bands, the proximal spot small and often diffuse; of the transverse band usually only the outer one indicated, being represented by black vein-spots which bear each a white dot; along the distal margin dark arcs filled in with white. Hindwing somewhat lighter than the forewing, with darkened anal angle nd a narrow diffuse whitish median band. Central Europe, sporadic and rare, as for as Southern Scandinavia, southward to North-East Spain and Northern Italy, eastward to Southern Russia and the eastern parts of the Carpathian Mts.; is absent from Lower Austria and South-East Europe. — In Norway the species is represented by a somewhat different form, nordlandica Strand (described from Saltdalen in Nordland) [nordlandica Strand, 1907 synonym]; it is smaller, and the ground-colour is more grey, without the reddish rust tone; the transverse bands and the costal spots are very distinct, especially the latter are prominently black and white. —Egg bluish white, minutely dotted with fuscous. Larva yellowish green, on the back with numerous low prominences which are more yellow and arranged on the whole in 4 longitudinal rows, the spiracles intensely black, each bearing a dark vivid red spot; the stigmata of the anterior and posterior segments, moreover, connected by a whitish longitudinal streak, which is absent from the median segments. June—August, on the top-branches of Birches. Pupa black-brown, in a cell in the ground slightly lined with silk. Moth April—May.

The moths are on wing from March to May depending on the location.

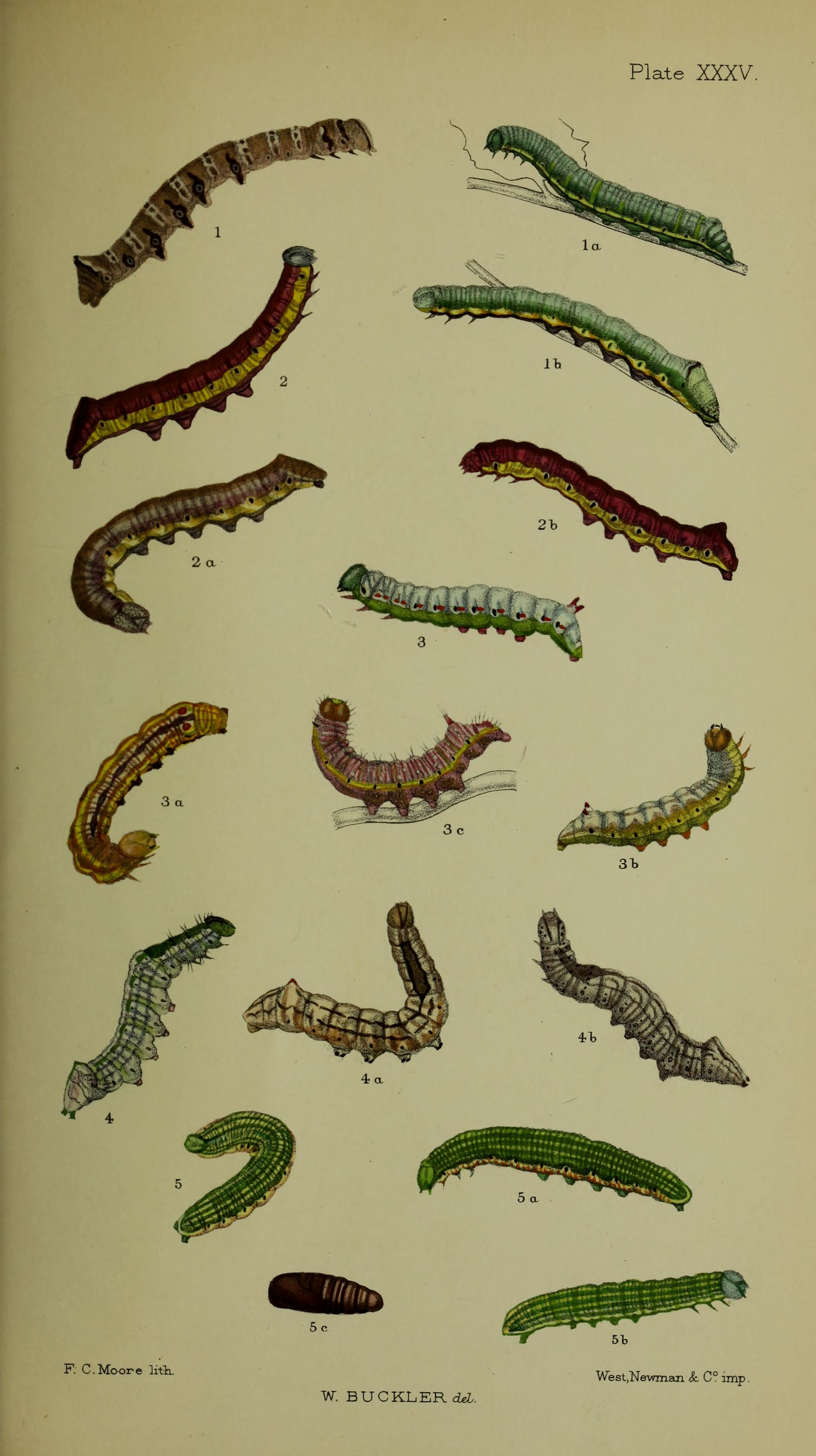
5, 5a, 5b larvae after last moult 5c pupa

The larvae feed on Betula and Alnus species.
