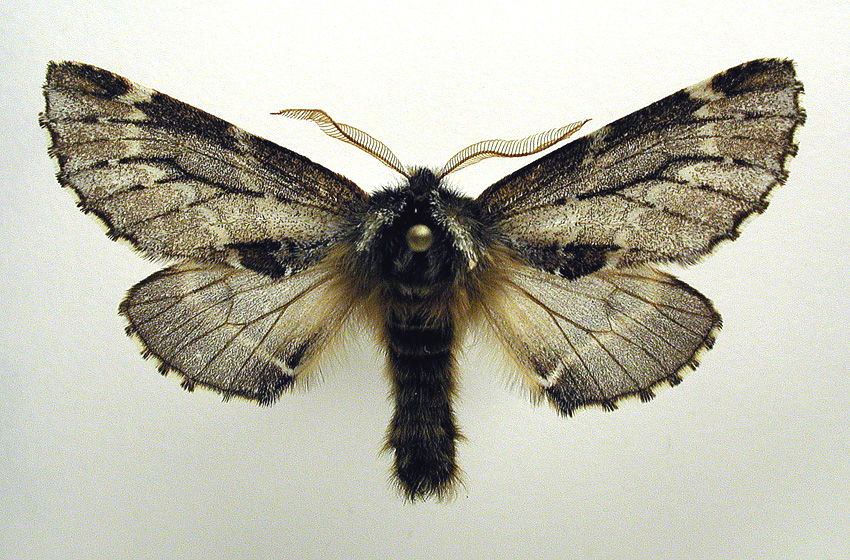

Scientific classification
- Kingdom: Animalia
- Phylum: Arthropoda
- Clade: Pancrustacea
- Class: Insecta
- Order: Lepidoptera
- Superfamily: Noctuoidea
- Family: Notodontidae
- Genus: Odontosia
- Species: O. sieversii

Binomial name
- Odontosia sieversii (Ménétriés, 1856)

Synonyms
- Notodonta sieversii Ménétriés, 1856; Odontosia sieversi ussurica Bytinski-Salz, 1939

= Odontosia sieversii =

Species of moth

Odontosia sieversii is a moth of the family Notodontidae. It is found from northern and central Europe to northern China and Japan.

The wingspan is 39–49 mm. Adults are on wing from the end of March to May.

The larvae feed on Betula species. Larvae can be found from April to May. The species overwinters as a pupa.
