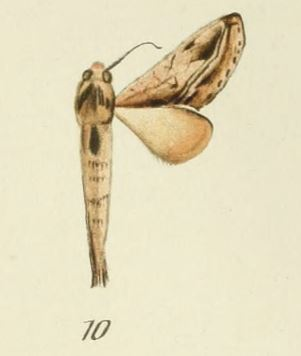
- Scalmicauda tessmanni

Scientific classification
- Kingdom: Animalia
- Phylum: Arthropoda
- Clade: Pancrustacea
- Class: Insecta
- Order: Lepidoptera
- Superfamily: Noctuoidea
- Family: Notodontidae
- Subfamily: Notodontinae
- Genus: Scalmicauda; Holland, 1893

Synonyms
- Graphidura Strand, 1911

= Scalmicauda =

Genus of moths

Scalmicauda is a genus of moths of the family Notodontidae. The genus was erected by William Jacob Holland in 1893.

== Species ==
- Scalmicauda acamas Kiriakoff, 1968
- Scalmicauda actor Kiriakoff, 1968
- Scalmicauda adusta Kiriakoff, 1963
- Scalmicauda afra Kiriakoff, 1968
- Scalmicauda agasthenes Kiriakoff, 1968
- Scalmicauda albobrunnea Kiriakoff, 1968
- Scalmicauda alboterminalis Kiriakoff, 1962
- Scalmicauda albunea Kiriakoff, 1968
- Scalmicauda aliena Kiriakoff, 1962
- Scalmicauda amphion Kiriakoff, 1968
- Scalmicauda ancaeus Kiriakoff, 1968
- Scalmicauda andraemon Kiriakoff, 1968
- Scalmicauda antiphus Kiriakoff, 1968
- Scalmicauda argenteomaculata (Aurivillius, 1892)
- Scalmicauda astyoche Kiriakoff, 1968
- Scalmicauda auribasis Kiriakoff, 1975
- Scalmicauda azebae Thiaucourt, 1977
- Scalmicauda benga Holland, 1893
- Scalmicauda bernardii Kiriakoff, 1968
- Scalmicauda bicolorata Gaede, 1928
- Scalmicauda brevipennis (Holland, 1893)
- Scalmicauda chalcedona Kiriakoff, 1968
- Scalmicauda confusa Kiriakoff, 1959
- Scalmicauda corinna Kiriakoff, 1968
- Scalmicauda corona Kiriakoff, 1968
- Scalmicauda costalis Kiriakoff, 1965
- Scalmicauda curvilinea Kiriakoff, 1959
- Scalmicauda decorata Kiriakoff, 1962
- Scalmicauda ectoleuca Hampson, 1910
- Scalmicauda ectomelinos Kiriakoff, 1962
- Scalmicauda epistrophus Kiriakoff, 1968
- Scalmicauda eriphyle Kiriakoff, 1979
- Scalmicauda eumela Kiriakoff, 1968
- Scalmicauda evadne Kiriakoff, 1979
- Scalmicauda fuscinota Aurivillius, 1904
- Scalmicauda geometrica Kiriakoff, 1969
- Scalmicauda griseomaculata Gaede, 1928
- Scalmicauda hoesemanni (Strand, 1911)
- Scalmicauda ignicolor Kiriakoff, 1964
- Scalmicauda lineata (Holland, 1893)
- Scalmicauda lycaon Kiriakoff, 1968
- Scalmicauda macrosema Kiriakoff, 1959
- Scalmicauda melasema Kiriakoff, 1959
- Scalmicauda molesta (Strand, 1911)
- Scalmicauda molestula Kiriakoff, 1959
- Scalmicauda myrine Kiriakoff, 1968
- Scalmicauda obliterata Kiriakoff, 1962
- Scalmicauda obscurior Gaede, 1928
- Scalmicauda oileus Kiriakoff, 1968
- Scalmicauda oneili Janse, 1920
- Scalmicauda oreas Kiriakoff, 1958
- Scalmicauda orthogramma Kiriakoff, 1960
- Scalmicauda ovalis Kiriakoff, 1965
- Scalmicauda pandarus Kiriakoff, 1968
- Scalmicauda paucinotata Kiriakoff, 1959
- Scalmicauda phorcys Kiriakoff, 1968
- Scalmicauda podarce Kiriakoff, 1968
- Scalmicauda pylaemenes Kiriakoff, 1968
- Scalmicauda rectilinea (Gaede, 1928)
- Scalmicauda remmia Kiriakoff, 1959
- Scalmicauda rubrolineata Kiriakoff, 1959
- Scalmicauda subfusca Kiriakoff, 1959
- Scalmicauda talaeon Kiriakoff, 1968
- Scalmicauda terminalis Kiriakoff, 1959
- Scalmicauda tessmanni (Strand, 1911)
- Scalmicauda thessala Kiriakoff, 1968
- Scalmicauda triangulum Kiriakoff, 1959
- Scalmicauda tricolor Kiriakoff, 1965
- Scalmicauda uniarcuata Kiriakoff, 1962
- Scalmicauda uniarculinea Kiriakoff, 1965
- Scalmicauda venustissima Kiriakoff, 1969
- Scalmicauda vinacea Kiriakoff, 1959
- Scalmicauda vulpinaria Kiriakoff, 1965
- Scalmicauda xanthogyna Hampson, 1910
