= Urgedra chlorolepis =

Scientific classification
- Kingdom: Animalia
- Phylum: Arthropoda
- Clade: Pancrustacea
- Class: Insecta
- Order: Lepidoptera
- Superfamily: Noctuoidea
- Family: Notodontidae
- Genus: Urgedra
- Species: U. chlorolepis

Binomial name
- Urgedra chlorolepis Miller & Thiaucourt, 2011

Species of moth

Urgedra chlorolepis is a moth of the family Notodontidae. It is found in north-eastern Ecuador.

The length of the forewings is 15–18.5 mm.
