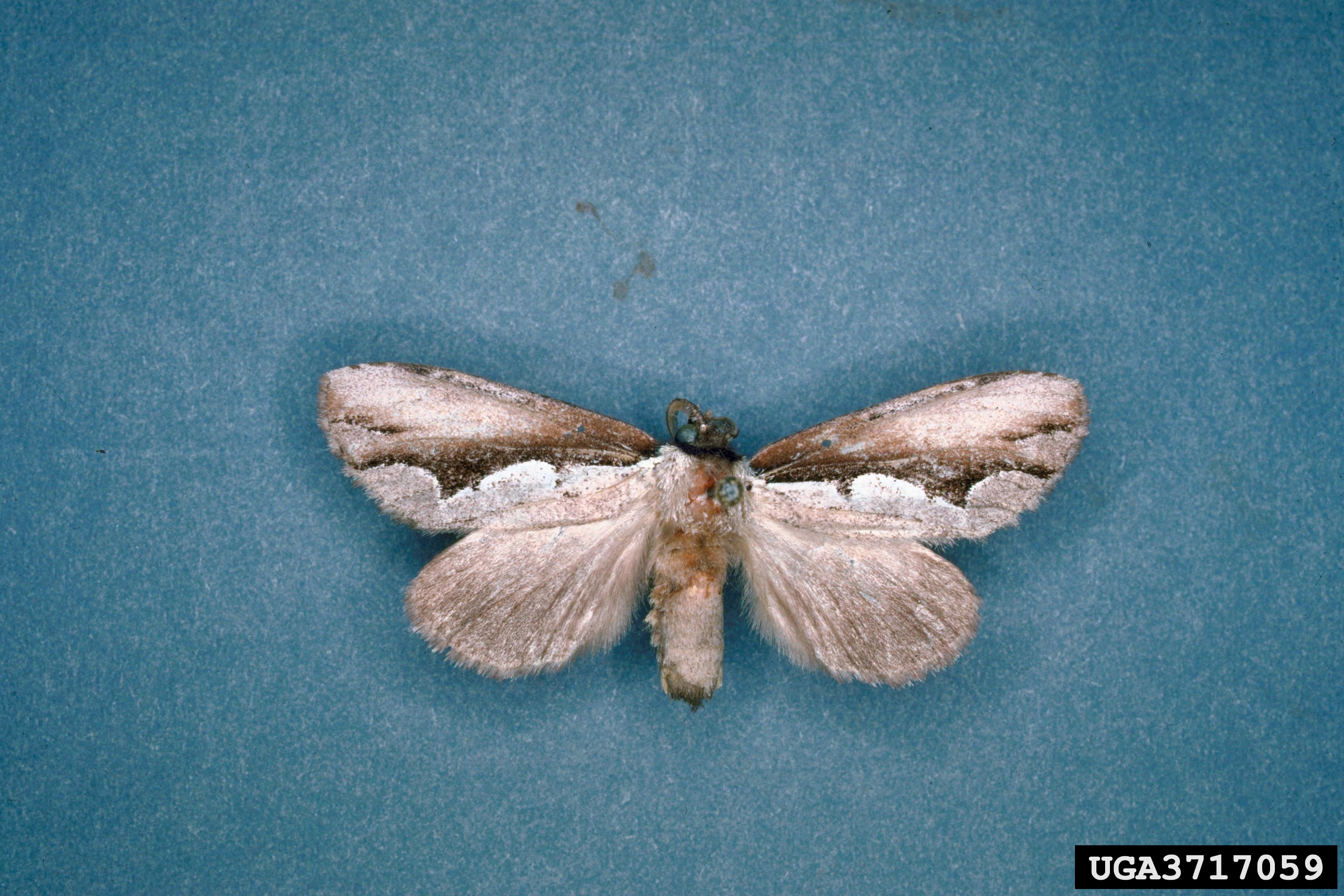
- Nerice bidentata

Scientific classification
- Kingdom: Animalia
- Phylum: Arthropoda
- Clade: Pancrustacea
- Class: Insecta
- Order: Lepidoptera
- Superfamily: Noctuoidea
- Family: Notodontidae
- Subfamily: Notodontinae
- Genus: Nerice; Walker, 1855

= Nerice =

Genus of moths

Nerice is a genus of moths of the family Notodontidae that are commonly found in the Amazon rainforest. The species was first described by Francis Walker in 1855.

== Selected species ==
- Nerice bidentata Walker, 1855
- Nerice davidi Oberthür, 1881
- Nerice upina Alpheraky, 1892
- Nerice aemulator Schintlmeister & Fang, 2001
- Nerice dispar (Cai, 1979)
- Nerice leechi Staudinger, 1892
- Nerice pictibasis (Hampson, 1897)
