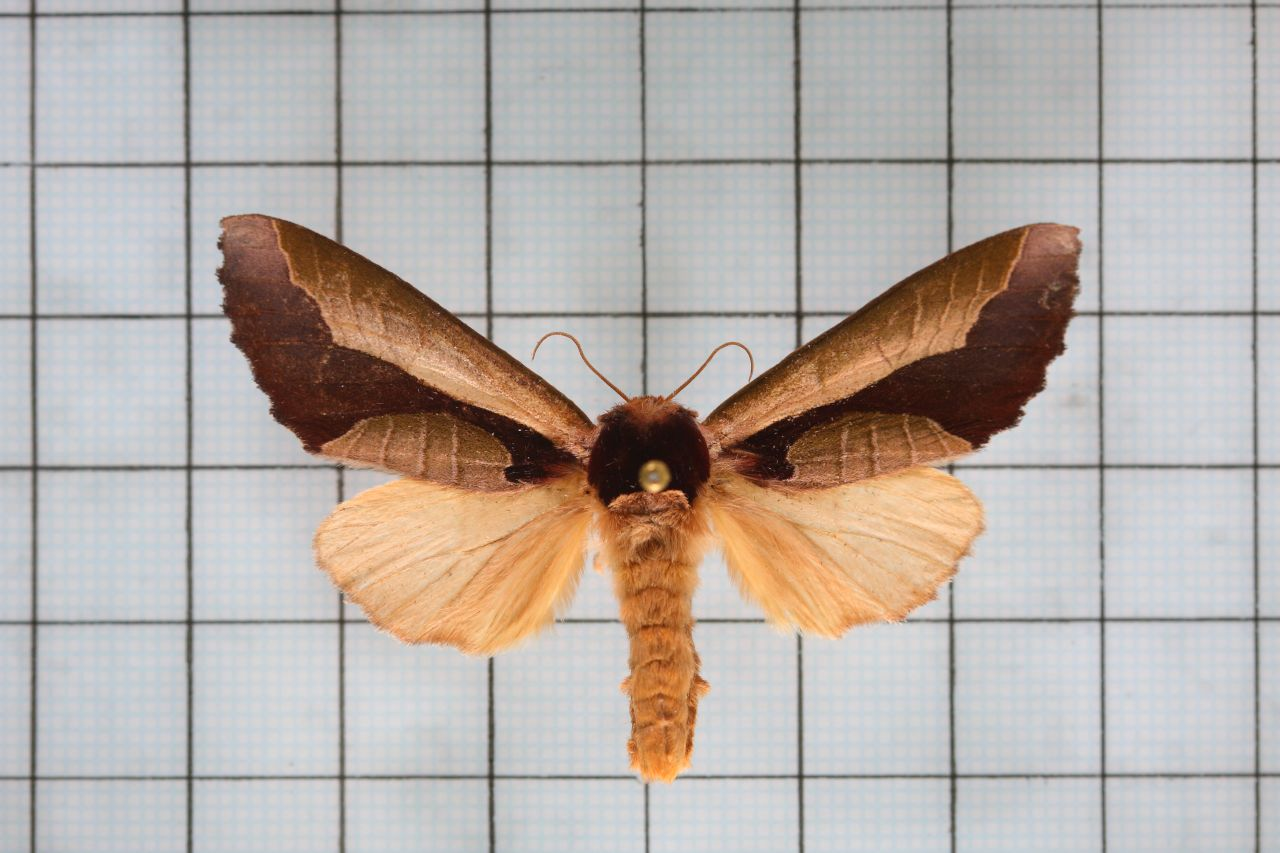
- Uropyia meticulodina

Scientific classification
- Kingdom: Animalia
- Phylum: Arthropoda
- Clade: Pancrustacea
- Class: Insecta
- Order: Lepidoptera
- Superfamily: Noctuoidea
- Family: Notodontidae
- Subfamily: Notodontinae
- Genus: Uropyia; Staudinger, 1892

Synonyms
- Dracoskapha Yang, 1955

= Uropyia =

Genus of moths

Uropyia is a genus of moths of the family Notodontidae described by Staudinger in 1892.

== Species ==
- Uropyia melli Schintlmeister, 2002
- Uropyia meticulodina (Oberthür, 1884)
- Uropyia pontada (Yang, 1995)
