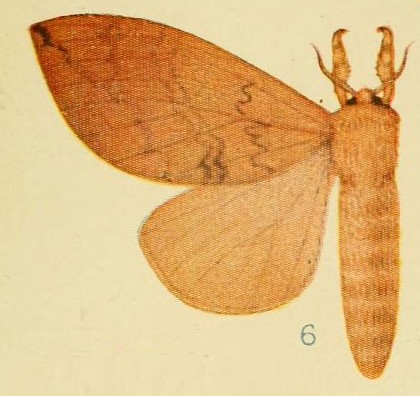

Scientific classification
- Kingdom: Animalia
- Phylum: Arthropoda
- Clade: Pancrustacea
- Class: Insecta
- Order: Lepidoptera
- Superfamily: Noctuoidea
- Family: Notodontidae
- Genus: Brachychira
- Species: B. ferruginea

Binomial name
- Brachychira ferruginea Aurivillius, 1905

= Brachychira ferruginea =

Species of moth

Brachychira ferruginea is a moth in the family Notodontidae first described by Per Olof Christopher Aurivillius in 1905.

== Distribution ==
It is found in Angola, Cameroon, and Nigeria.
