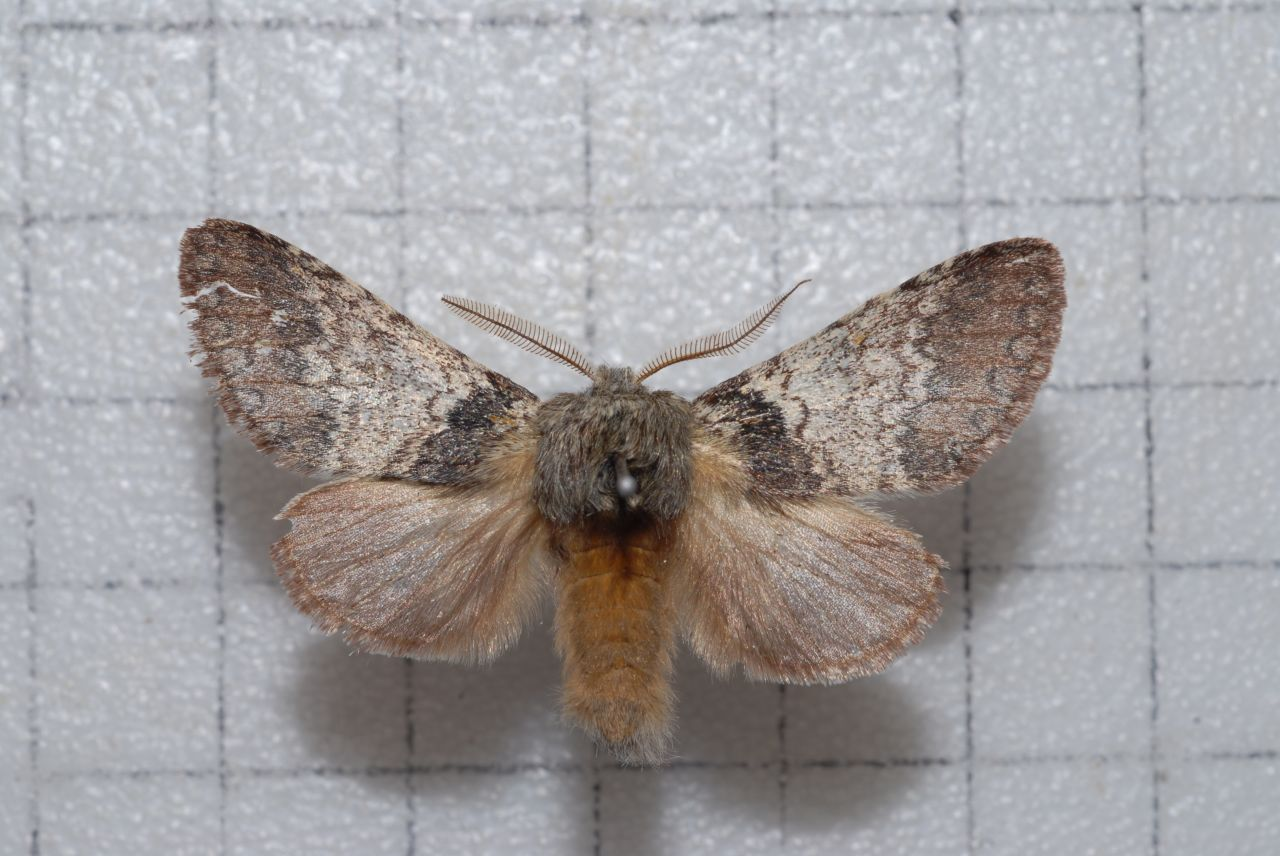

Scientific classification
- Kingdom: Animalia
- Phylum: Arthropoda
- Clade: Pancrustacea
- Class: Insecta
- Order: Lepidoptera
- Superfamily: Noctuoidea
- Family: Notodontidae
- Genus: Pseudofentonia
- Species: P. medioalbida

Binomial name
- Pseudofentonia medioalbida Nakamura, 1973

= Pseudofentonia medioalbida =

Species of moth

Pseudofentonia medioalbida is a species of moth of the family Notodontidae. It is found in Taiwan.
