= Xanthodonta =

Scientific classification
- Kingdom: Animalia
- Phylum: Arthropoda
- Clade: Pancrustacea
- Class: Insecta
- Order: Lepidoptera
- Superfamily: Noctuoidea
- Family: Notodontidae
- Subfamily: Notodontinae
- Genus: Xanthodonta; Gaede, 1928

Synonyms
- Pydnoides Kiriakoff, 1979

Genus of moths

Xanthodonta is a genus of moths of the family Notodontidae. The genus was erected by Max Gaede in 1928.

== Species ==
- Xanthodonta argyllacea Kiriakoff, 1961
- Xanthodonta brunneata (Gaede, 1934)
- Xanthodonta brunneifascia (Hampson, 1910)
- Xanthodonta debilis Gaede, 1928
- Xanthodonta diatrecta (Hampson, 1910)
- Xanthodonta isabellina Kiriakoff, 1979
- Xanthodonta lusingae Kiriakoff, 1954
- Xanthodonta minima (Hampson, 1910)
- Xanthodonta nigrovittata (Aurivilius, 1921)
- Xanthodonta unicornis Kiriakoff, 1961
- Xanthodonta xanthippa Kiriakoff, 1968
