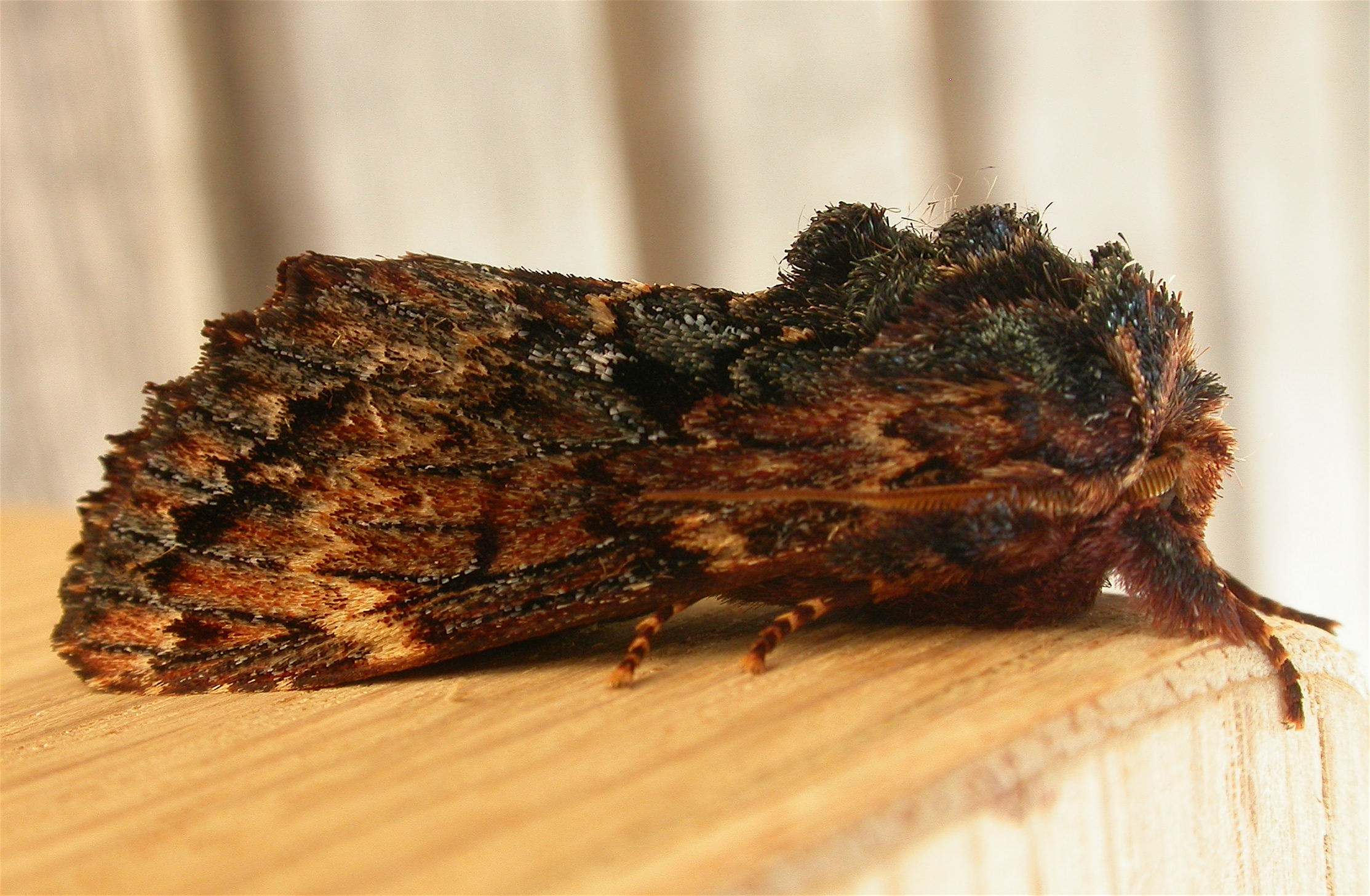

Scientific classification
- Kingdom: Animalia
- Phylum: Arthropoda
- Clade: Pancrustacea
- Class: Insecta
- Order: Lepidoptera
- Superfamily: Noctuoidea
- Family: Notodontidae
- Subfamily: Notodontinae
- Genus: Sorama; Walker, 1855
- Species: S. bicolor

Binomial name
- Sorama bicolor Walker, 1855

= Sorama =

Genus of moths

Sorama bicolor, the two-coloured notodontid, is a moth of the family Notodontidae first described by Francis Walker in 1855. It is the only species in the genus Sorama. It is found in Australia.

The wingspan is about 60 mm for females and about 40 mm for males.

The larvae feed on Eucalyptus species.
