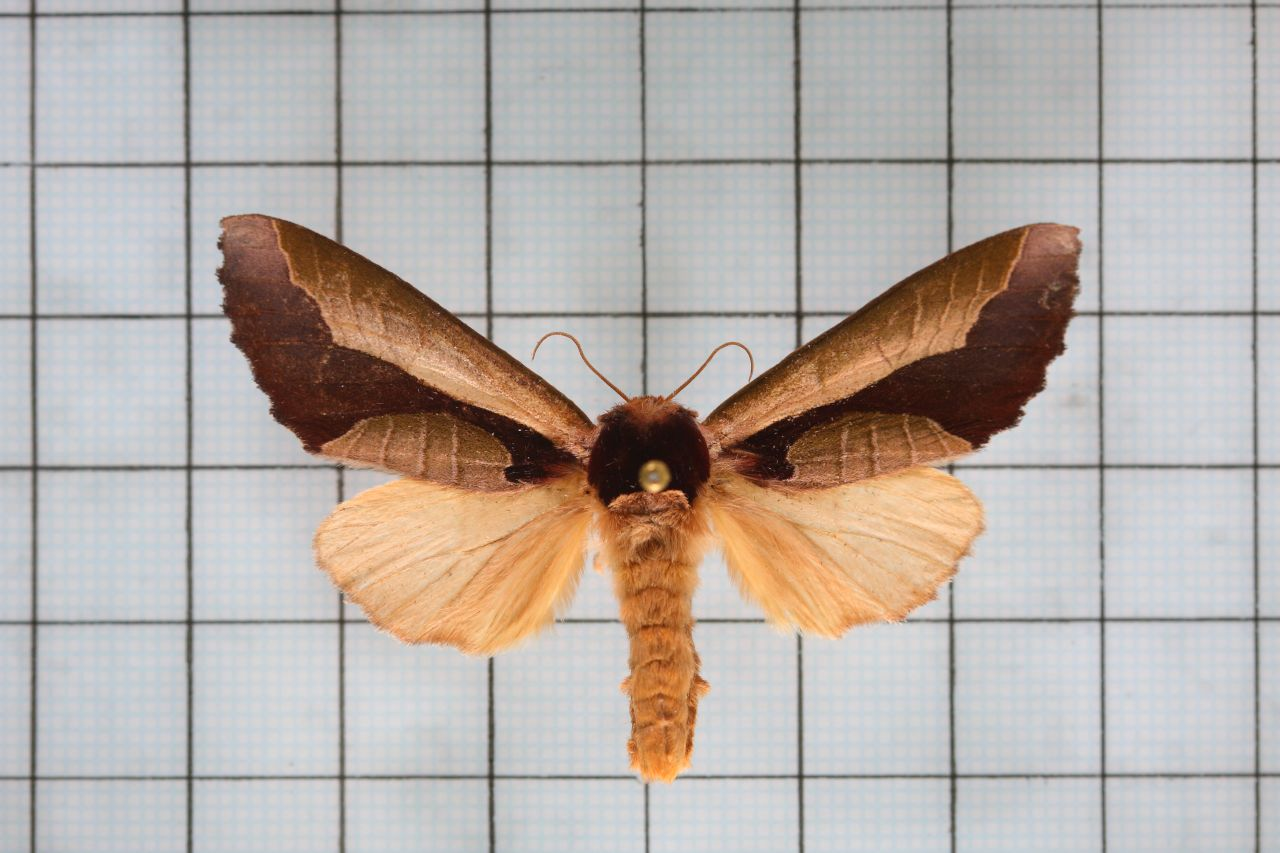

Scientific classification
- Kingdom: Animalia
- Phylum: Arthropoda
- Clade: Pancrustacea
- Class: Insecta
- Order: Lepidoptera
- Superfamily: Noctuoidea
- Family: Notodontidae
- Genus: Uropyia
- Species: U. meticulodina

Binomial name
- Uropyia meticulodina (Oberthür, 1884)

Synonyms
- Notodonta meticulodina Oberthür, 1884; Uropyia hammamelis Mell, 1930

= Uropyia meticulodina =

Species of moth

Uropyia meticulodina is a species of moth of the family Notodontidae first described by Oberthür in 1884. It is found in Taiwan, Japan and the Chinese provinces of Yunnan, Hubei and Shaanxi.

The wingspan is 45–55 mm. Adults are dead leaf mimics.
