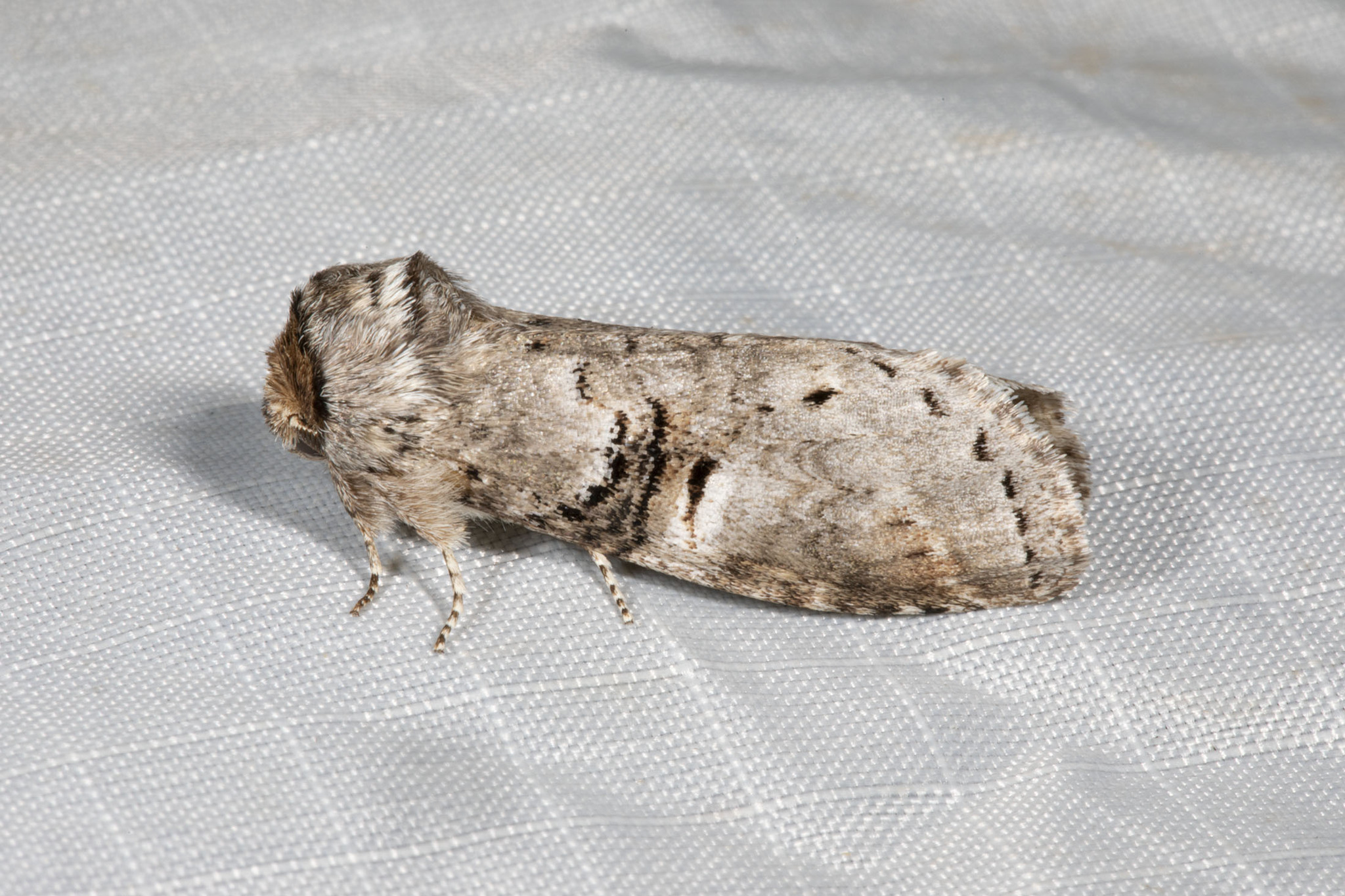

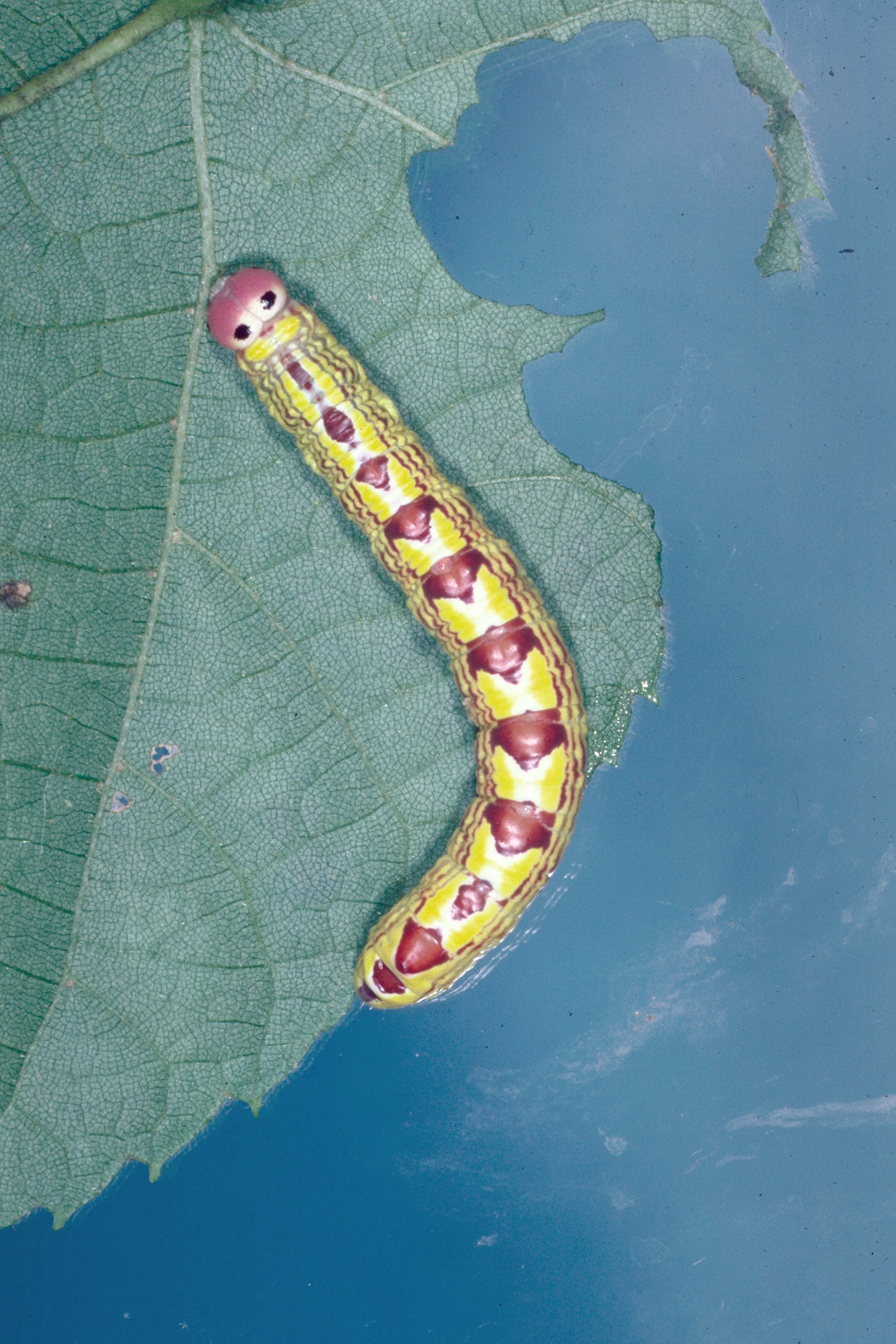
- Adult (top) and larvae (bottom)

Scientific classification
- Kingdom: Animalia
- Phylum: Arthropoda
- Clade: Pancrustacea
- Class: Insecta
- Order: Lepidoptera
- Superfamily: Noctuoidea
- Family: Notodontidae
- Genus: Ellida
- Species: E. caniplaga

Binomial name
- Ellida caniplaga (Walker, 1856)

Synonyms
- Cymatophora caniplaga Walker, 1856; Edema transversta Walker, 1865; Ellida gelida Grote, 1876

= Ellida caniplaga =

Linden prominent moth

Species of moth

Ellida caniplaga, the linden prominent moth, is a species of moth in the family Notodontidae. It is found from Texas to Florida, north to New Brunswick, west to Ontario and Minnesota.

The wingspan is 34–44 mm. Adults are on wing from April to September. There are two generations per year in the south.

The larvae feed on the leaves of Tilia species.
