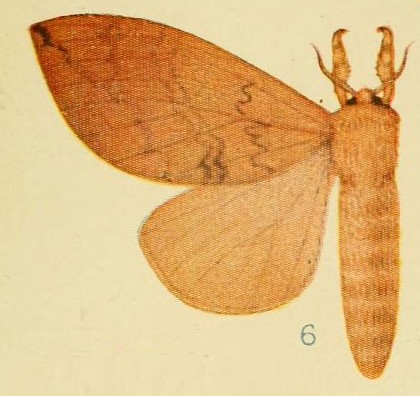
- Brachychira ferruginea

Scientific classification
- Kingdom: Animalia
- Phylum: Arthropoda
- Clade: Pancrustacea
- Class: Insecta
- Order: Lepidoptera
- Superfamily: Noctuoidea
- Family: Notodontidae
- Subfamily: Notodontinae
- Genus: Brachychira; Aurivillius, 1905

Synonyms
- Brachychyra Berio, 1937

= Brachychira =

Genus of moths

Brachychira is a genus of moths of the family Notodontidae. The genus was erected by Per Olof Christopher Aurivillius in 1905.

== Species ==
- Brachychira alternata Kiriakoff, 1966
- Brachychira argentina Kiriakoff, 1955
- Brachychira argyrosticta Kiriakoff, 1954
- Brachychira bernardii Kiriakoff, 1966
- Brachychira davus Kiriakoff, 1965
- Brachychira destituta Kiriakoff, 1966
- Brachychira dormitans Berio, 1937
- Brachychira elegans Aurivillius, 1907
- Brachychira exusta Kiriakoff, 1966
- Brachychira ferruginea Aurivillius, 1905
- Brachychira incerta Kiriakoff, 1966
- Brachychira ligata Kiriakoff, 1955
- Brachychira lunuligera Kiriakoff, 1954
- Brachychira murina Kiriakoff, 1966
- Brachychira numenius Kiriakoff, 1955
- Brachychira pretiosa Kiriakoff, 1962
- Brachychira punctulata Kiriakoff, 1966
- Brachychira subargentea Kiriakoff, 1955
