= Urgedra quindinata =

Scientific classification
- Kingdom: Animalia
- Phylum: Arthropoda
- Clade: Pancrustacea
- Class: Insecta
- Order: Lepidoptera
- Superfamily: Noctuoidea
- Family: Notodontidae
- Genus: Urgedra
- Species: U. quindinata

Binomial name
- Urgedra quindinata Dognin, 1910

Synonyms
- Urgedra pavimenta var. quindinata Dognin, 1910

Species of moth

Urgedra quindinata is a moth of the family Notodontidae. It is found in Colombia.
