= Urgedra viridiflava =

Scientific classification
- Kingdom: Animalia
- Phylum: Arthropoda
- Clade: Pancrustacea
- Class: Insecta
- Order: Lepidoptera
- Superfamily: Noctuoidea
- Family: Notodontidae
- Genus: Urgedra
- Species: U. viridiflava

Binomial name
- Urgedra viridiflava Dognin, 1911

Species of moth

Urgedra viridiflava is a moth of the family Notodontidae. It is found in western Colombia.
