= Urgedra janzeni =

Scientific classification
- Kingdom: Animalia
- Phylum: Arthropoda
- Clade: Pancrustacea
- Class: Insecta
- Order: Lepidoptera
- Superfamily: Noctuoidea
- Family: Notodontidae
- Genus: Urgedra
- Species: U. janzeni

Binomial name
- Urgedra janzeni Miller & Thiaucourt, 2011

Species of moth

Urgedra janzeni is a moth of the family Notodontidae first described by James S. Miller and Paul Thiaucourt in 2011. It is found in north-eastern Ecuador.

The length of the forewings is 17-20.5 mm.

== Etymology ==
The species is named in honour of Daniel H. Janzen.
