= Pseudofentonia =

Scientific classification
- Kingdom: Animalia
- Phylum: Arthropoda
- Clade: Pancrustacea
- Class: Insecta
- Order: Lepidoptera
- Superfamily: Noctuoidea
- Family: Notodontidae
- Subfamily: Notodontinae
- Genus: Pseudofentonia; Strand, 1912

Synonyms
- Eufentonia Matsumura, 1922; Calyptronotum Roepke, 1944; Viridifentonia Nakamura, 1974; Disparia Nagano, 1916; Epifentonia Kiriakoff, 1960; Polystictina Kiriakoff, 1968; Mimus Schintlmeister, 1989; Lanna Kemal & Koçak, 2005 (replacement name for Mimus); Dymantis Schintlmeister, 1997; Vietnamina Kemal & Koçak, 2005 (replacement name for Dymantis)

Genus of moths

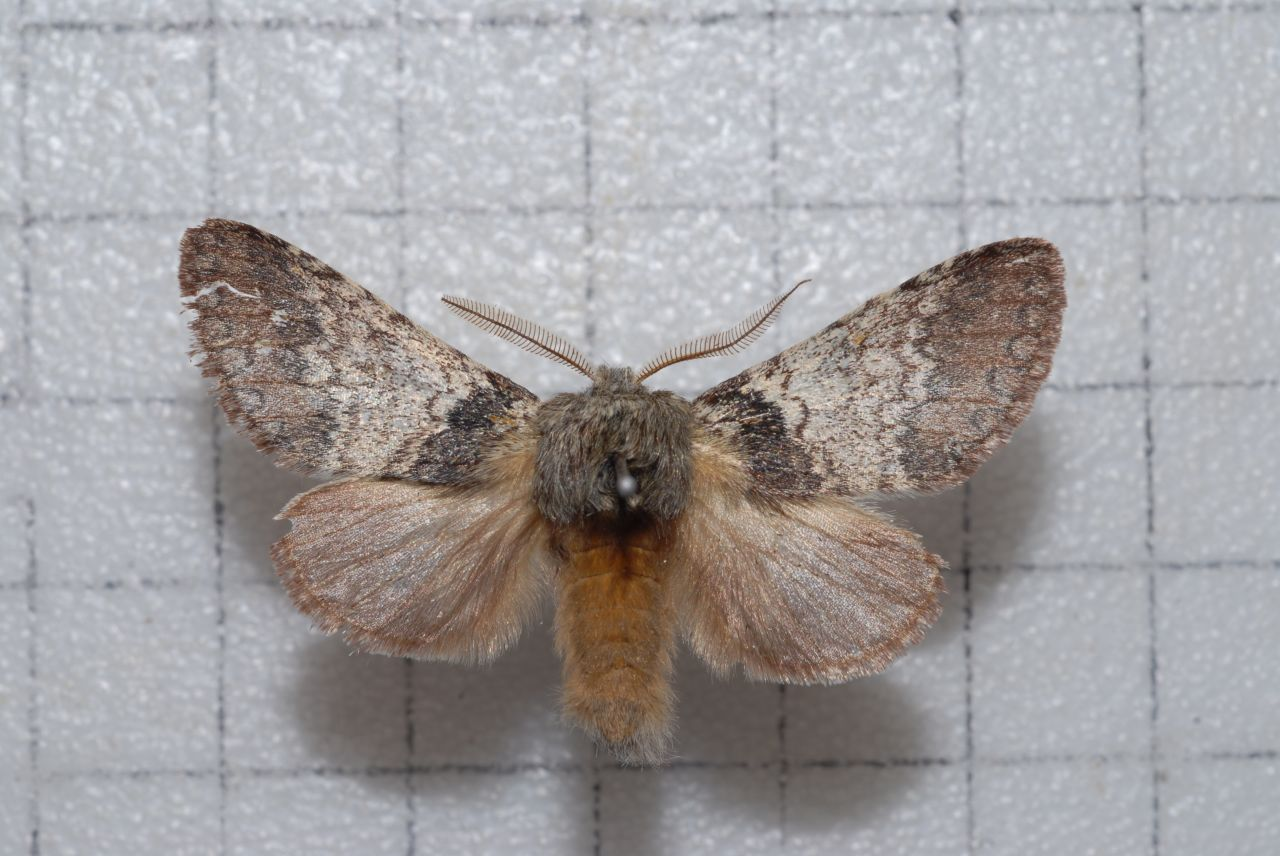
Pseudofentonia (Mimus) medioalbida (Nakamura 1973)

Pseudofentonia is a genus of moths of the family Notodontidae erected by Embrik Strand in 1912.

== Species ==
- Subgenus Pseudofentonia Strand, 1912
  - Pseudofentonia argentifera (Moore, [1866])
- Subgenus Calyptronotum Roepke, 1944
  - Pseudofentonia ocularis Semper, 1898
  - Pseudofentonia gualberta Schaus, 1928
- Subgenus Viridifentonia Nakamura, 1974
  - Pseudofentonia plagiviridis (Moore, 1879)
- Subgenus Eufentonia Matsumura, 1922
  - Pseudofentonia emiror Schintlmeister, 1989
  - Pseudofentonia nakamurai Sugi, 1990
  - Pseudofentonia nihonica (Wileman, 1911)
- Subgenus Lanna Kemal & Koçak, 2005
  - Pseudofentonia medioalbida Nakamura, 1973
  - Pseudofentonia nigrofasciata (Wileman, 1910)
- Subgenus Disparia Nagano, 1916
  - Pseudofentonia diluta Hampson, 1910
  - Pseudofentonia dua Schintlmeister, 1997
  - Pseudofentonia grisescens Gaede, 1934
  - Pseudofentonia mediopallens (Sugi, 1989)
  - Pseudofentonia obliquiplaga (Moore, 1879)
  - Pseudofentonia sundana (Roepke, 1944)
- Subgenus Vietnamina Kemal & Koçak, 2005
  - Pseudofentonia tiga Schintlmeister, 1997
- Subgenus Polystictina Kiriakoff, 1968
  - Pseudofentonia maculata (Moore, 1879)
- Subgenus Epistauropus Gaede, 1930 (formerly in Neodrymonia)
  - Pseudofentonia singapura Gaede, 1930
  - Pseudofentonia terminalis (Kiriakoff, 1963)
- Subgenus unknown
  - Pseudofentonia walshiae Roepke 1944
