= Afrocerura cameroona =

Scientific classification
- Kingdom: Animalia
- Phylum: Arthropoda
- Class: Insecta
- Order: Lepidoptera
- Family: Notodontidae
- Subfamily: Notodontinae
- Genus: Afrocerura
- Species: A. cameroona

Binomial name
- Afrocerura cameroona (Bethune-Baker, 1927)

Synonyms
- Cerura cameroona Bethune-Baker, 1927; Cerura thomensis Talbot, 1929

Species of moth

Afrocerura cameroona is a moth in the family Notodontidae first described by George Thomas Bethune-Baker in 1927. It is found in Cameroon, the Democratic Republic of the Congo, Gabon and São Tomé & Principe (São Tomé).

The wingspan is about 60 millimetres (2.4 in). Both wings are shining snow white, with a few black markings. The forewings have a trace of an oblique interrupted black dash in the fold and a trace of a median interrupted line, visible as a small black costal mark. There is also a trace of another line in the cell, and a fair sized mark on the inner margin. There is a trace of two very short black costal dashes beyond the cell, followed by a black wedge-shaped costal mark. A bare trace of a black subterminal line is mainly noticeable by a fair sized black mark on the inner margin almost in the tornus. The hindwings are uniform white.

== Subspecies ==
- Afrocerura cameroona cameroona
- Afrocerura cameroona thomensis (Talbot, 1929) (São Tomé)
