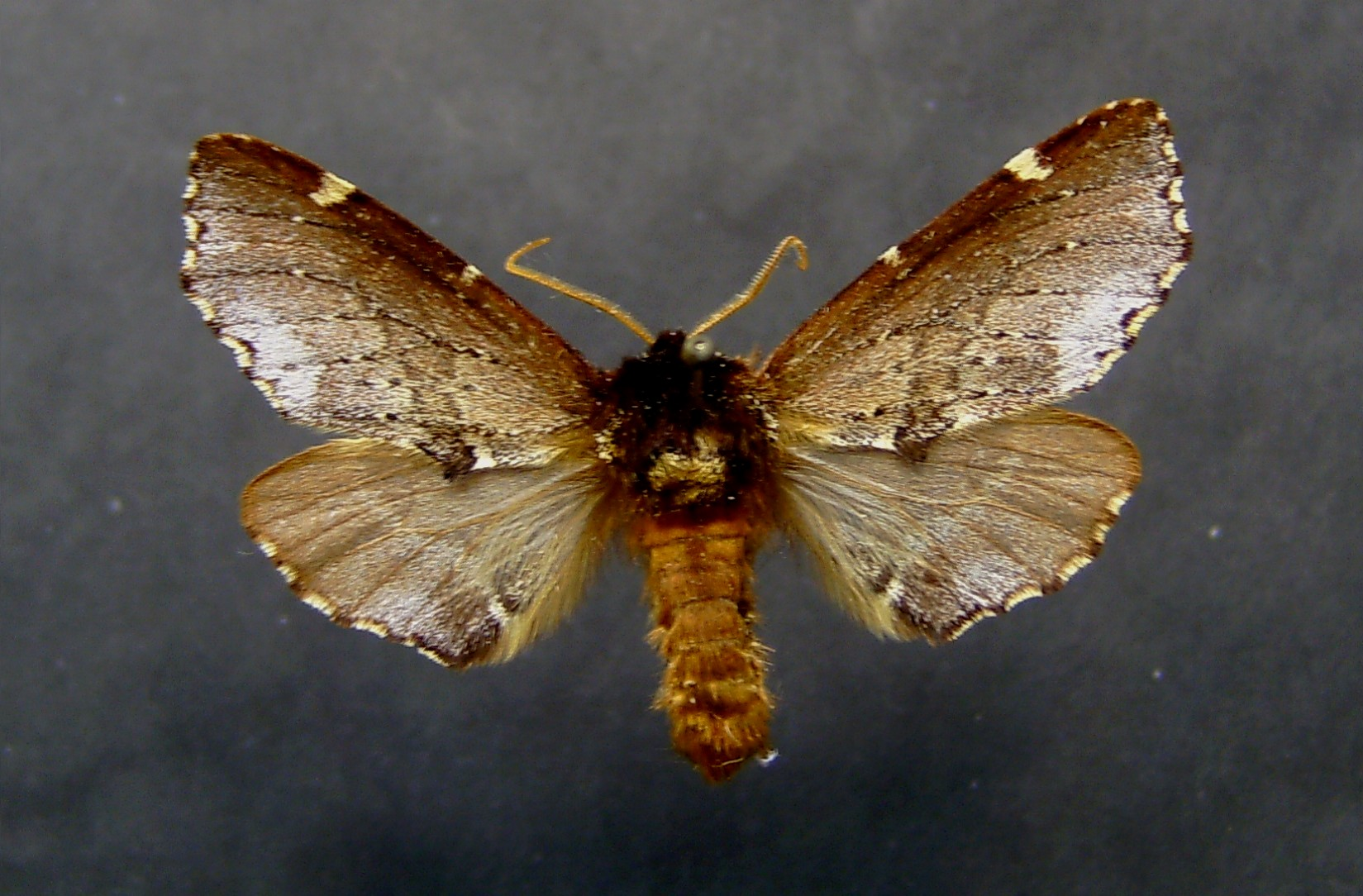
- Odontosia carmelita

Scientific classification
- Kingdom: Animalia
- Phylum: Arthropoda
- Clade: Pancrustacea
- Class: Insecta
- Order: Lepidoptera
- Superfamily: Noctuoidea
- Family: Notodontidae
- Tribe: Notodontini
- Genus: Odontosia; Hübner, [1819]

= Odontosia =

Genus of moths

Odontosia is a genus of moths of the family Notodontidae erected by Jacob Hübner in 1819.

== Selected species ==
- Odontosia carmelita (Esper, [1798])
- Odontosia sieversii (Menetries, 1856)
- Odontosia elegans (Strecker, 1885)
- Odontosia grisea (Strecker, 1885)
