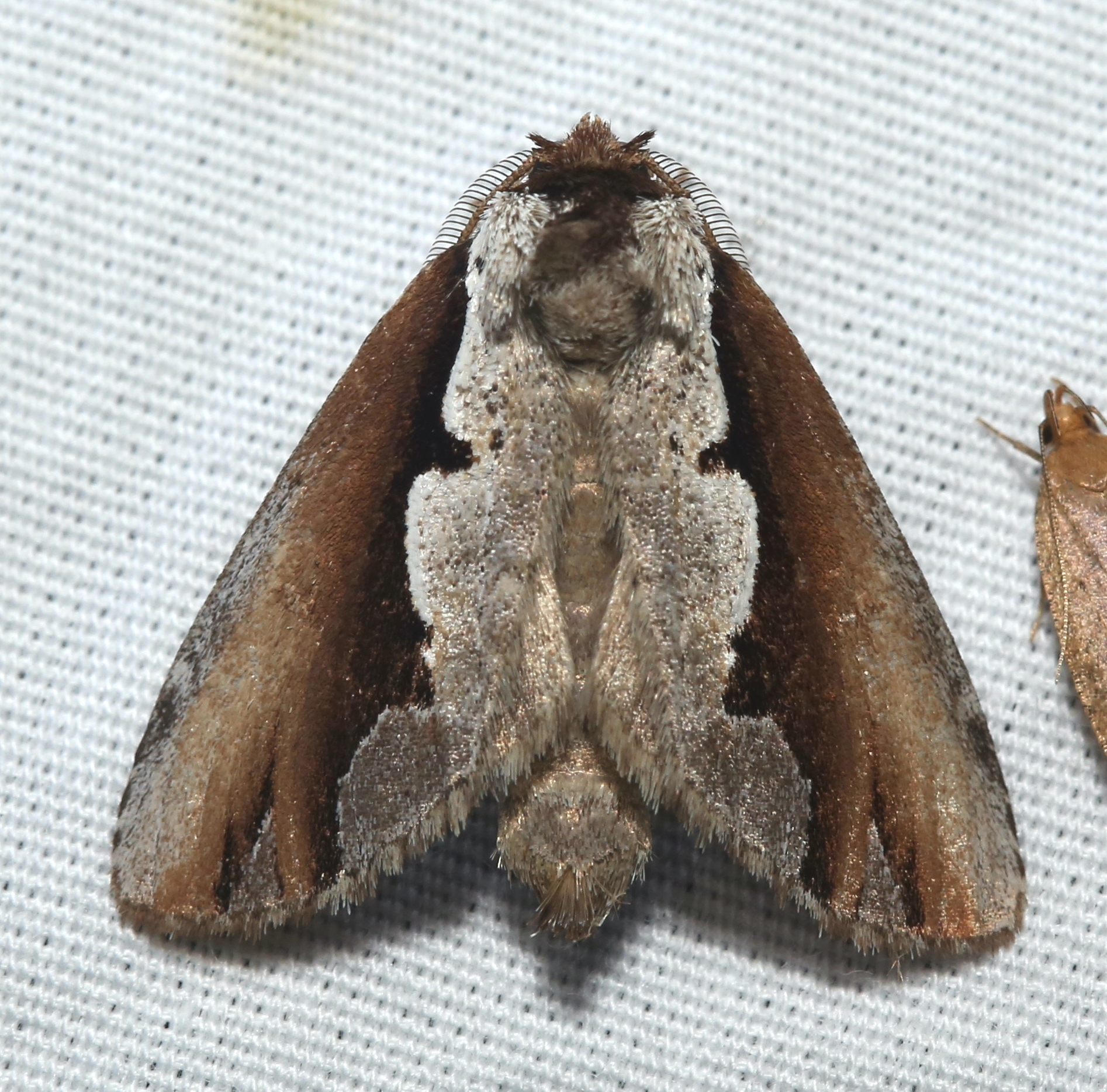
- Adult
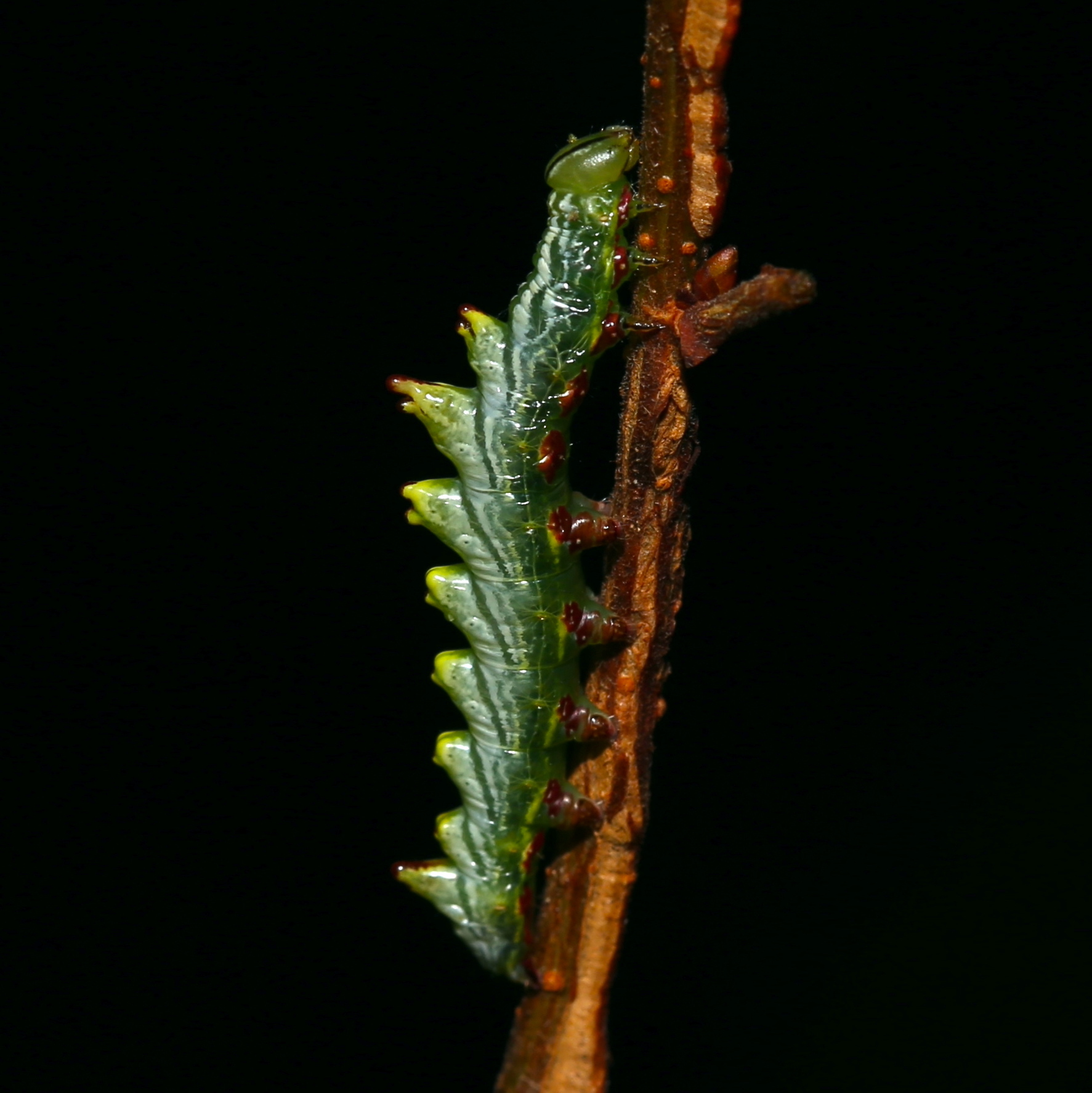
- Larva

Scientific classification
- Kingdom: Animalia
- Phylum: Arthropoda
- Clade: Pancrustacea
- Class: Insecta
- Order: Lepidoptera
- Superfamily: Noctuoidea
- Family: Notodontidae
- Genus: Nerice
- Species: N. bidentata

Binomial name
- Nerice bidentata Walker, 1855

= Nerice bidentata =

Species of moth

Nerice bidentata, the base-streaked prominent moth or double-toothed prominent moth, is a moth of the family Notodontidae. It is found in from Nova Scotia to Florida, west to Texas and north to Saskatchewan.

The wingspan is 30–40 mm. They are on wing from April to September and again from May to August in one generation per year in the north.

The larvae feed on the leaves of Ulmus species. They are chalky-green and are similar to the leaf edges of the host plant. Larvae can be found from June to October.

== Gallery ==
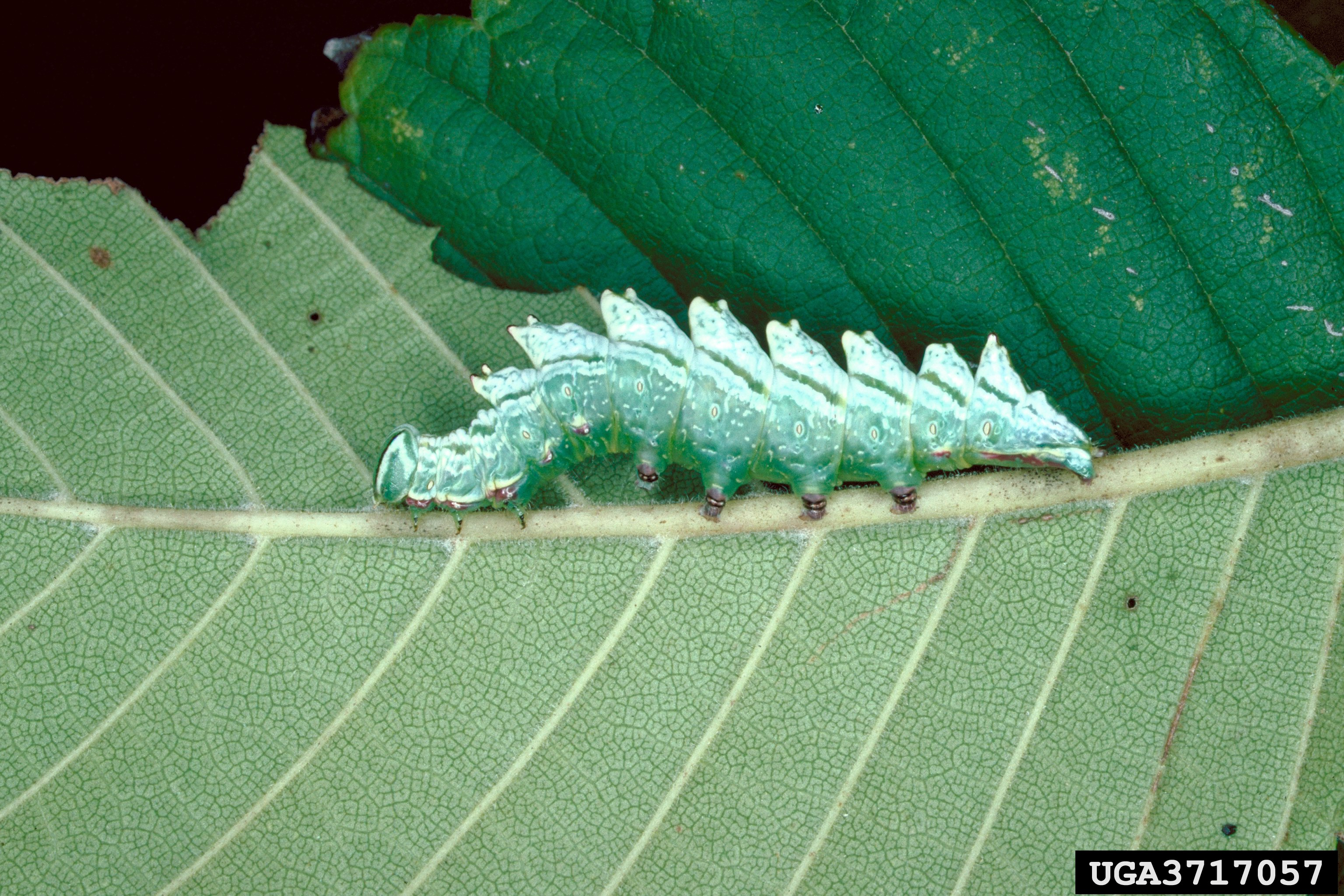
Larva

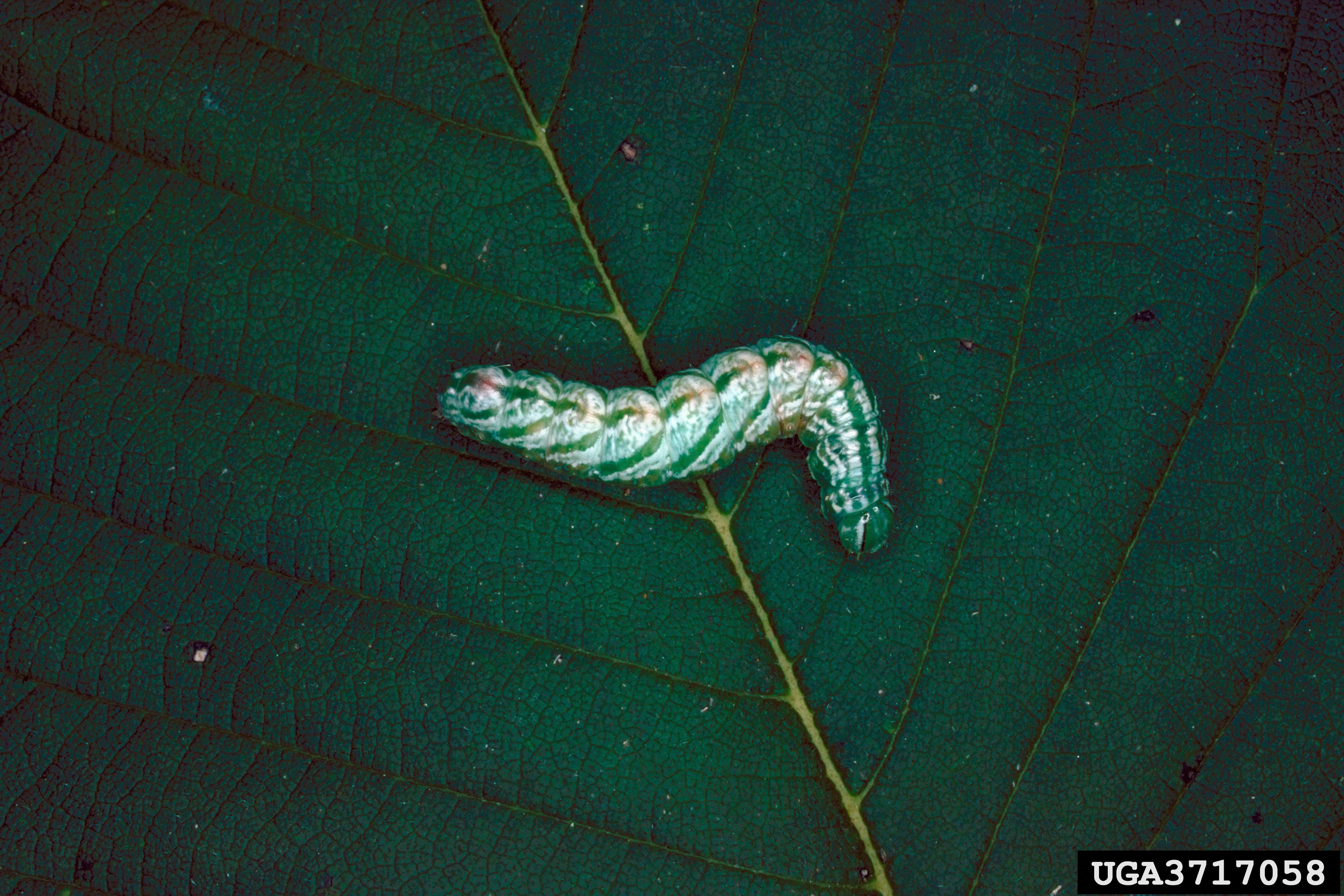
Larva
