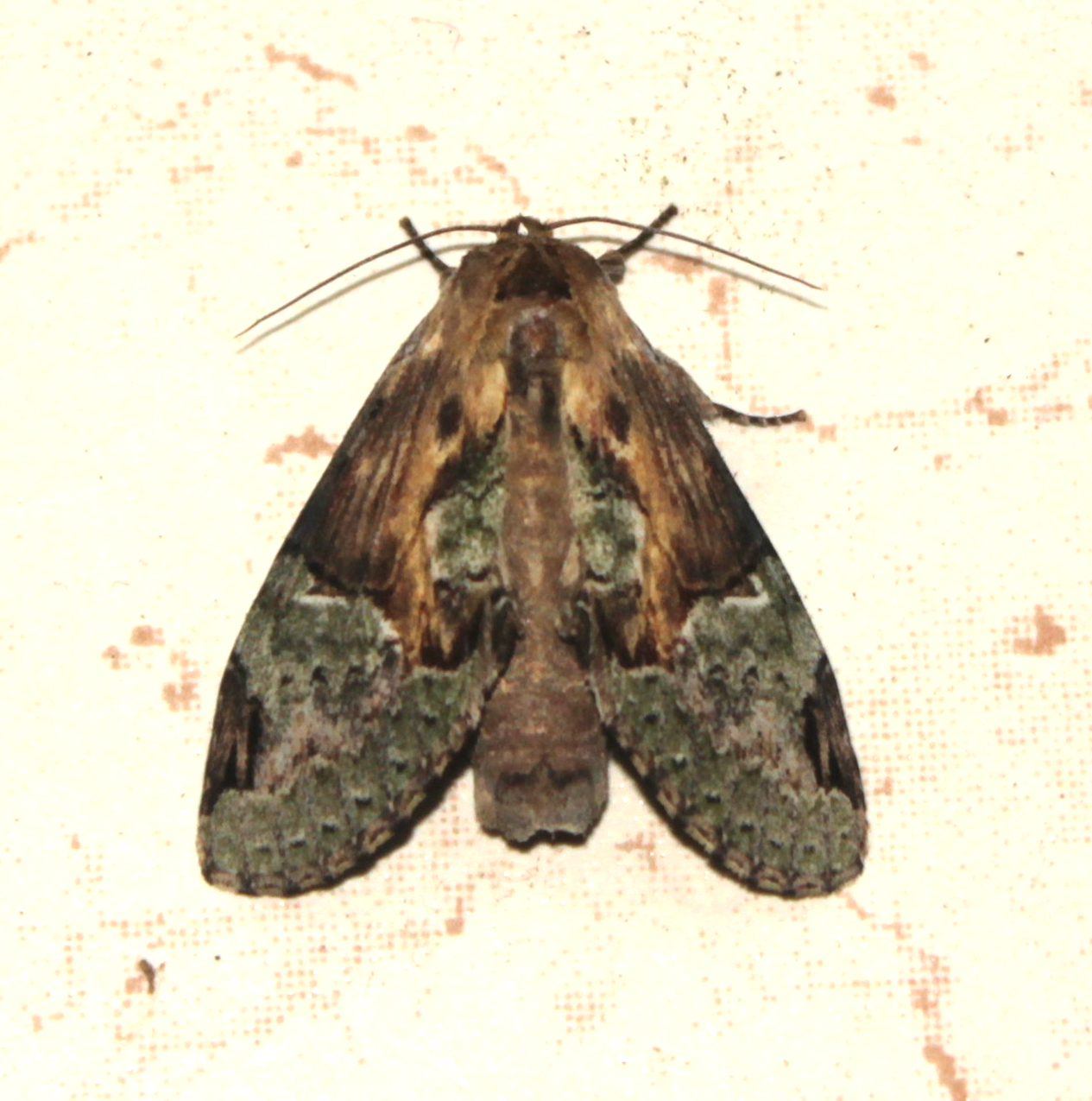

Scientific classification
- Missing taxonomy template (fix): Chadisra
- Species: Template:Taxonomy/ChadisraC. bipars

Binomial name
- Template:Taxonomy/ChadisraChadisra bipars Walker, 1862

Synonyms
- Metasomera plagifera Matsumura, 1925; Chadisra basivacua

= Chadisra bipars =

Species of moth

Chadisra bipars is a moth of the family Notodontidae. It was described by Francis Walker in 1862 and is found in the Indomalayan realm.

== Description ==
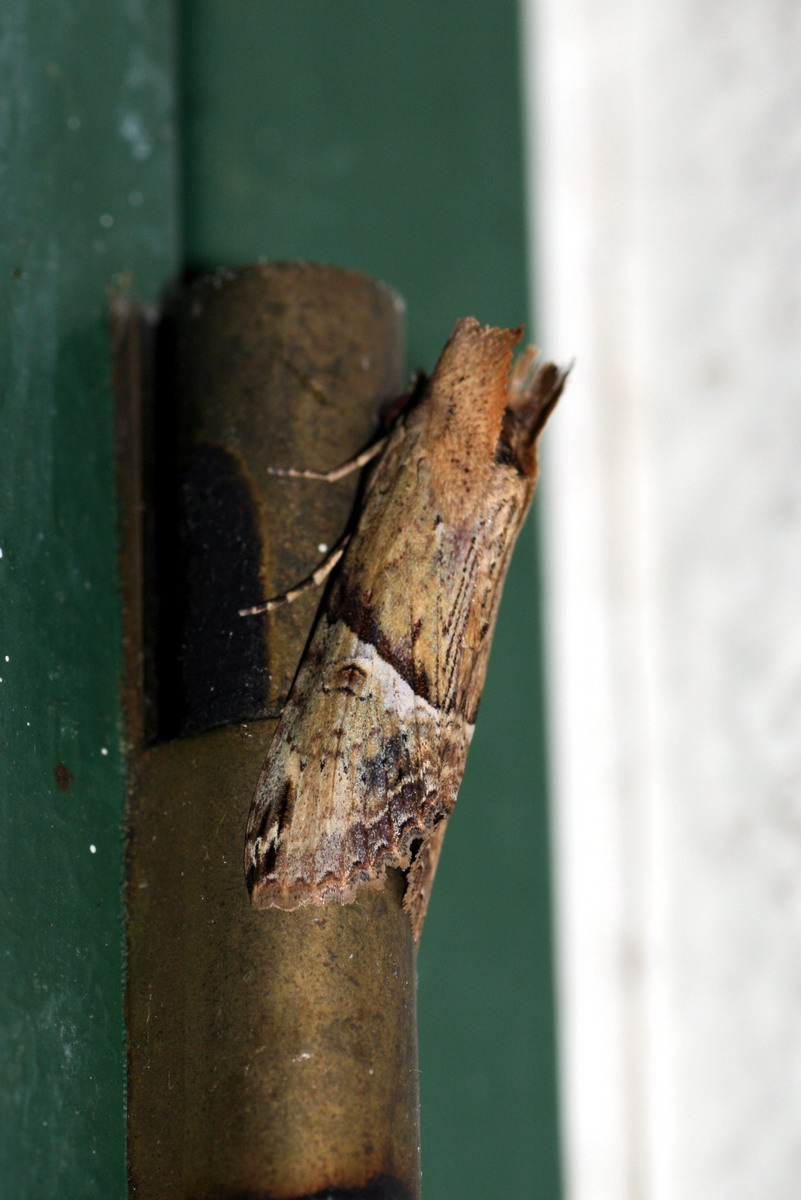

The species is similar to C. bipartita. The wingspan is 35–38 mm for males and 45–50 mm for females. Larvae are known to feed on Trema orientalis. In males, head, thorax and abdomen is reddish brown. Forewings with basal area red-brown with fine pale streaks. A black medial line bent inwards at vein 2. There are two postmedial lines with brown patches between them at costa and inner margin and with black dentate marks on them. Hindwings are pale fuscous and the margin is darker. A pale streak at anal angle and cilia is whitish towards the apex. In female, head, thorax and base of forewings ochreous-white. The markings of the forewing more distinct than that of male. Larva greenish white above and green below. There are pale green oblique lateral lines with a grey bordered yellow dorsal line with a red tubercle on 11th somite. Legs green.
