= Urgedra striata =

Scientific classification
- Kingdom: Animalia
- Phylum: Arthropoda
- Clade: Pancrustacea
- Class: Insecta
- Order: Lepidoptera
- Superfamily: Noctuoidea
- Family: Notodontidae
- Genus: Urgedra
- Species: U. striata

Binomial name
- Urgedra striata (Druce, 1906)

Synonyms
- Heterocampa striata Druce, 1906

Species of moth

Urgedra striata is a moth of the family Notodontidae. It is found in western Colombia.
