= List of moths of Great Britain (Noctuidae) =

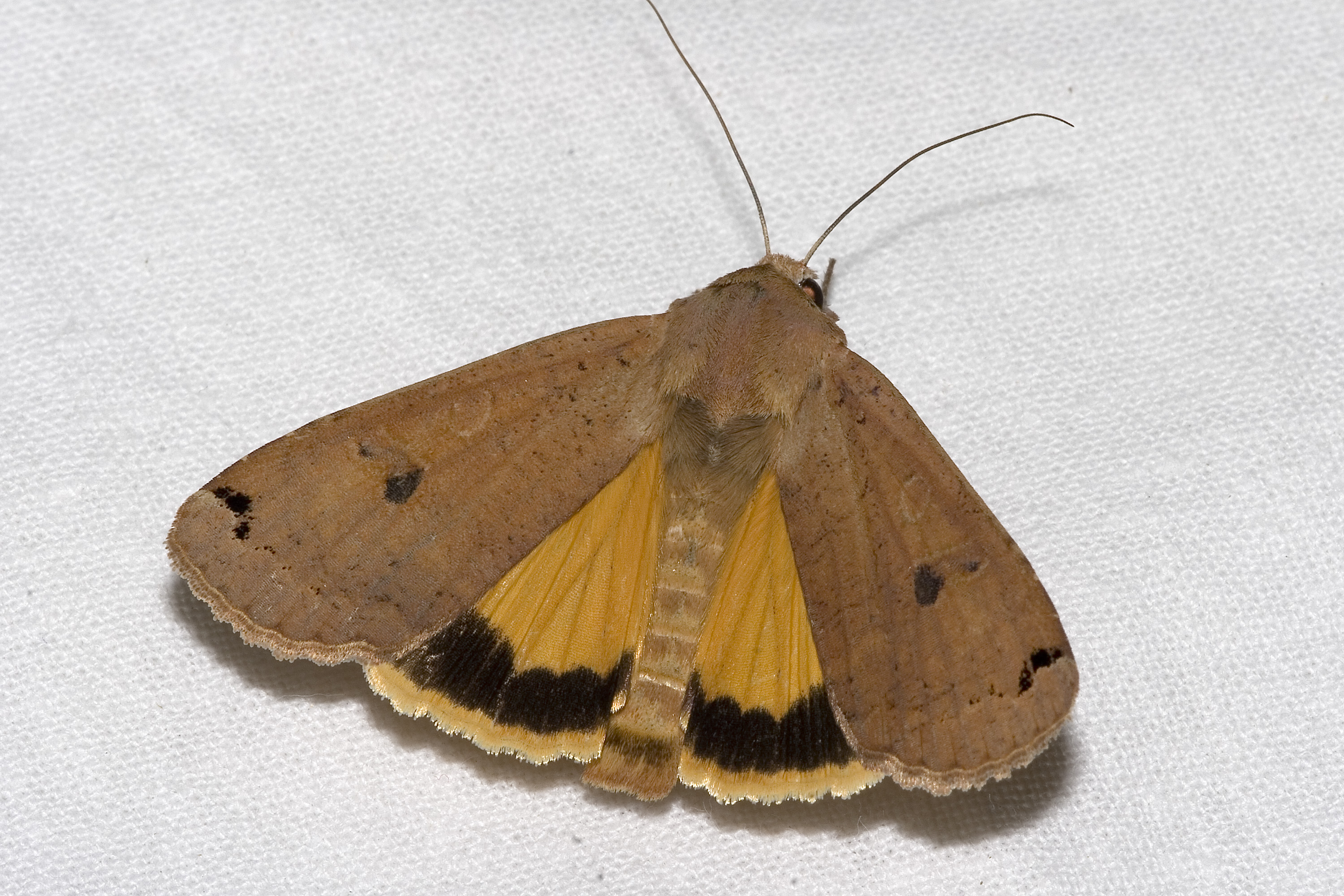
Large yellow underwing showing hindwings that give it its name

The family Noctuidae is the largest family of macro-moths in Great Britain, where over 400 species occur:

== Subfamily Noctuinae ==
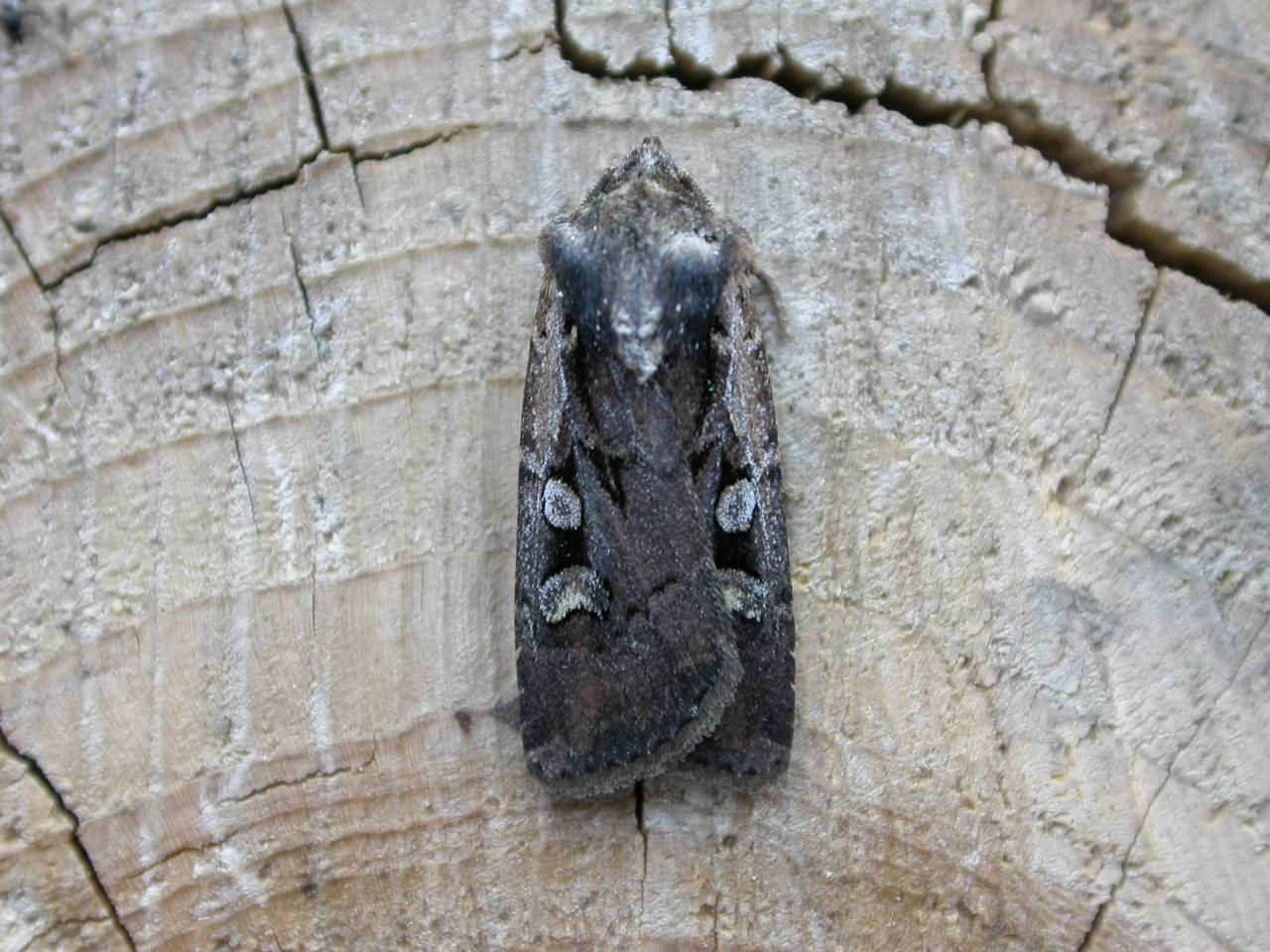
Square-spot dart

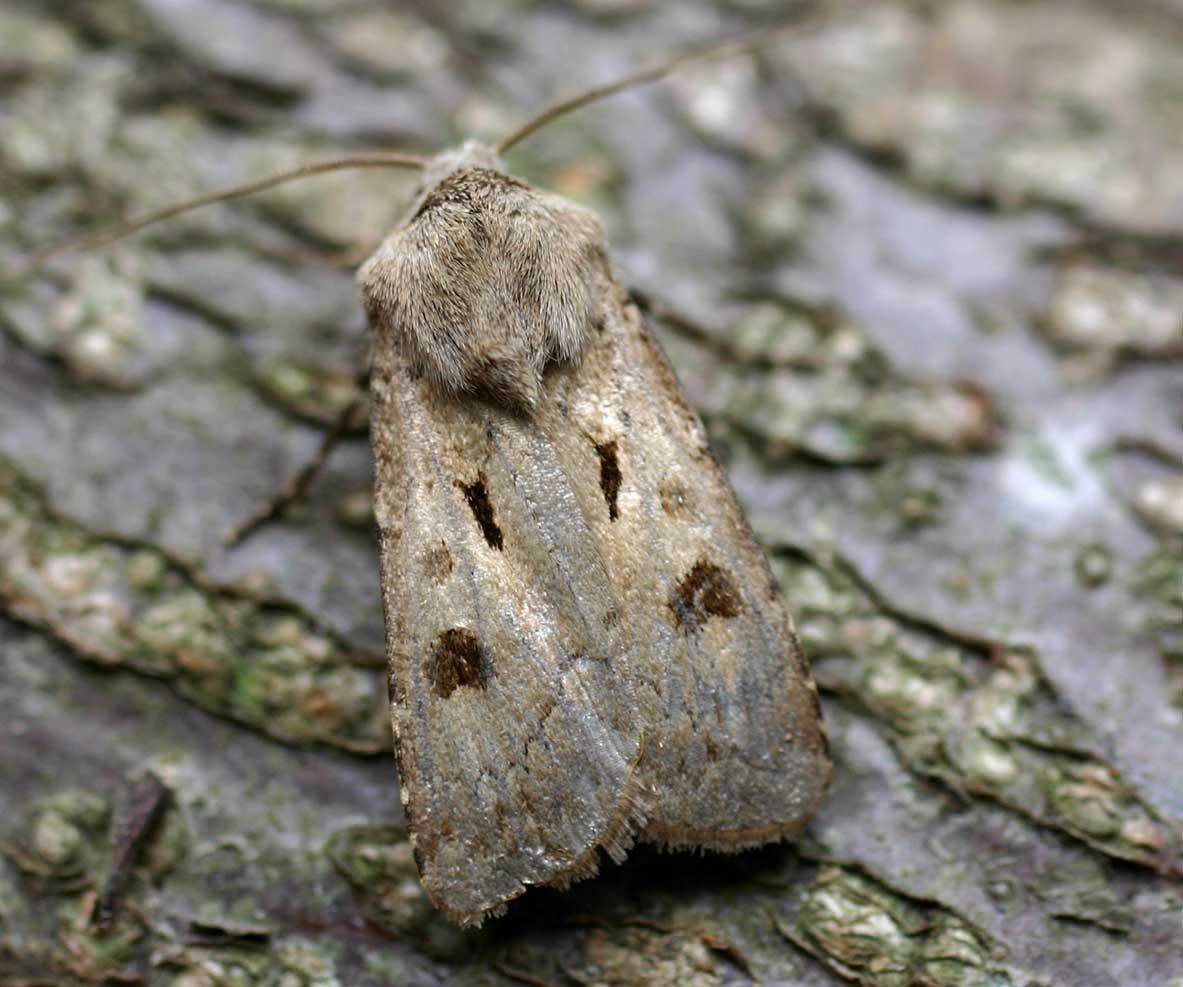
Heart and dart

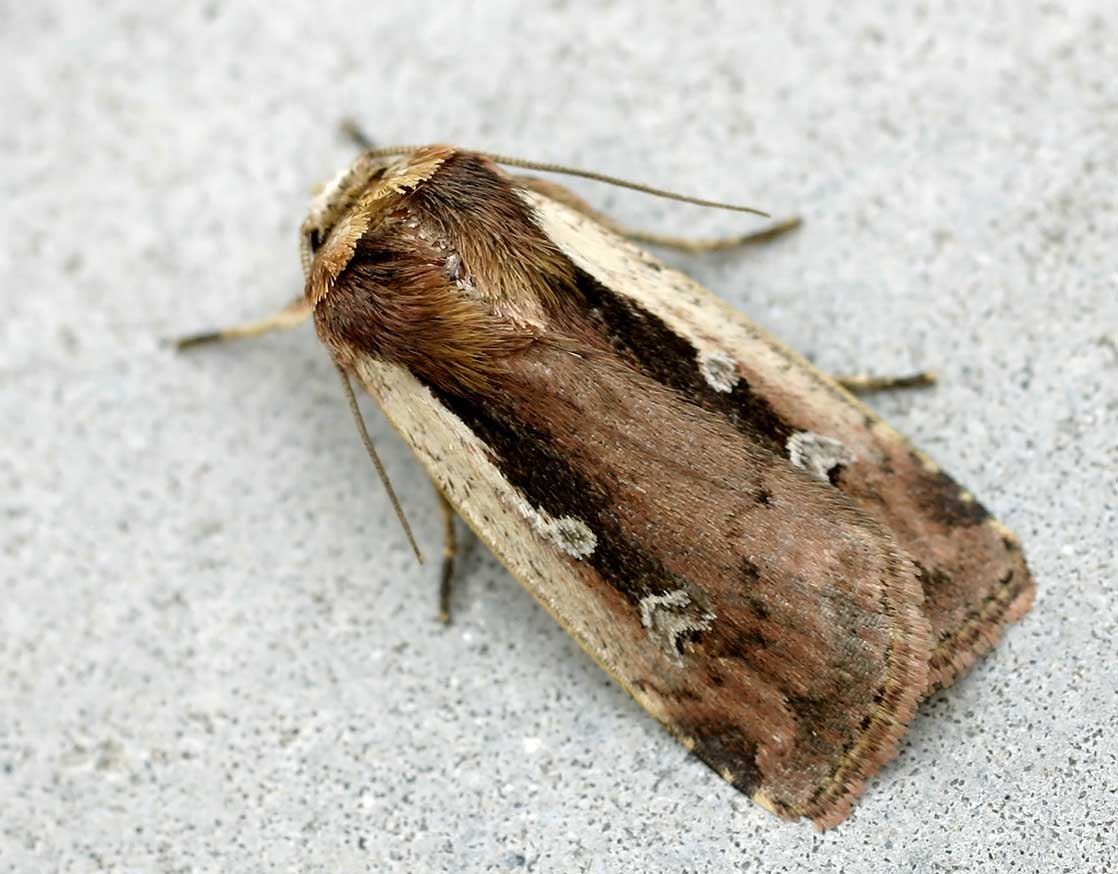
Flame shoulder

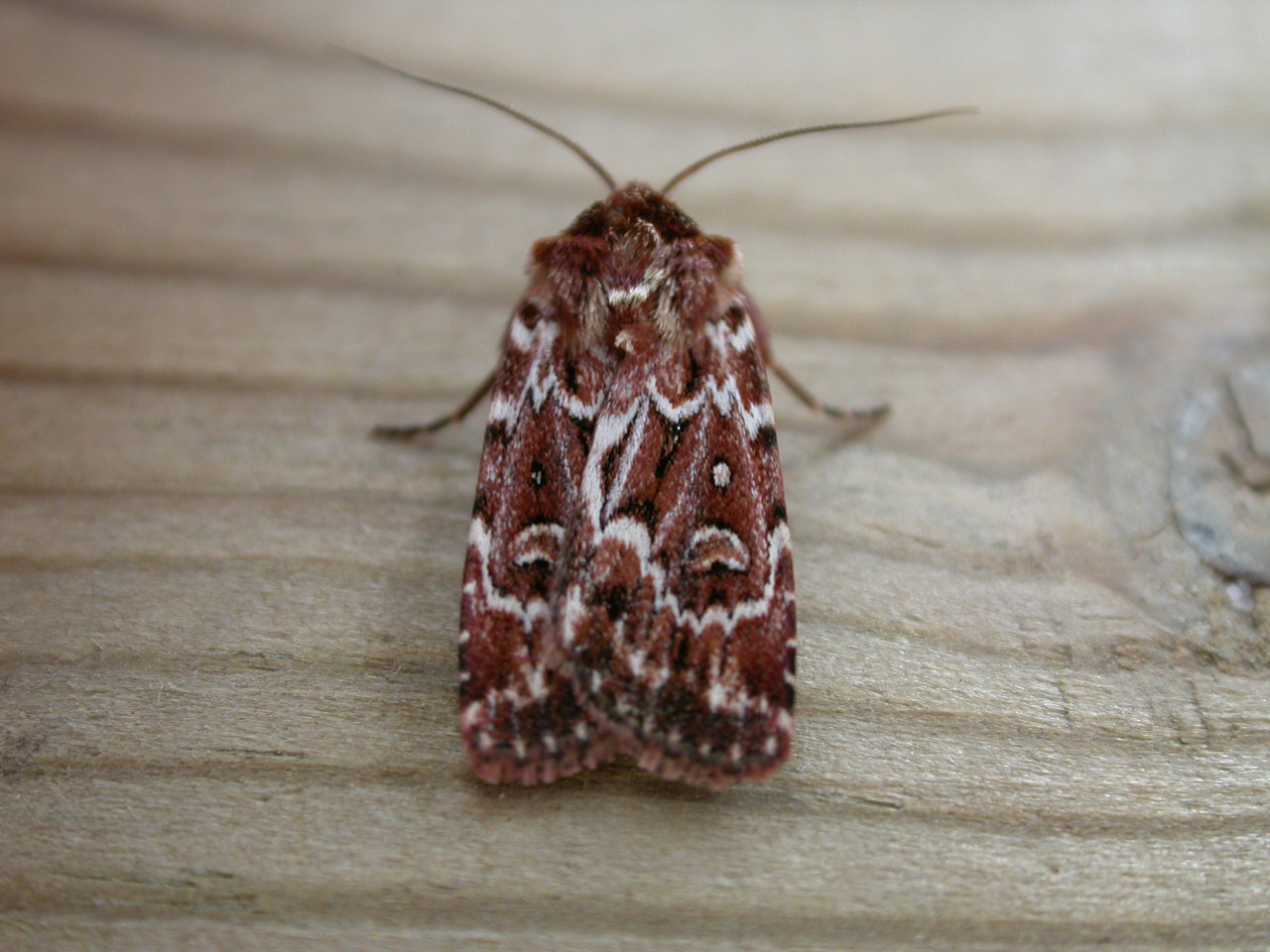
True lover's knot

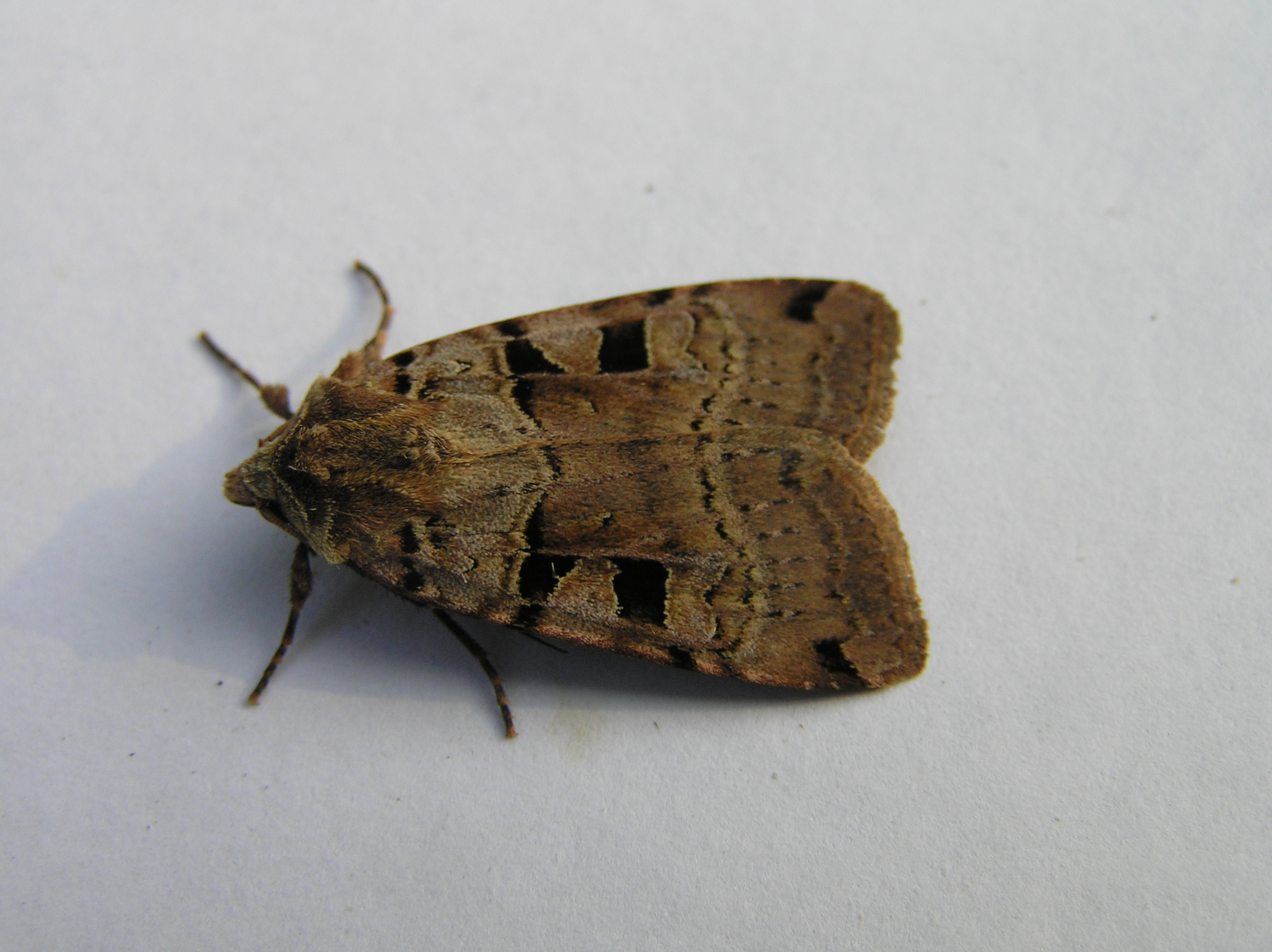
Double square spot

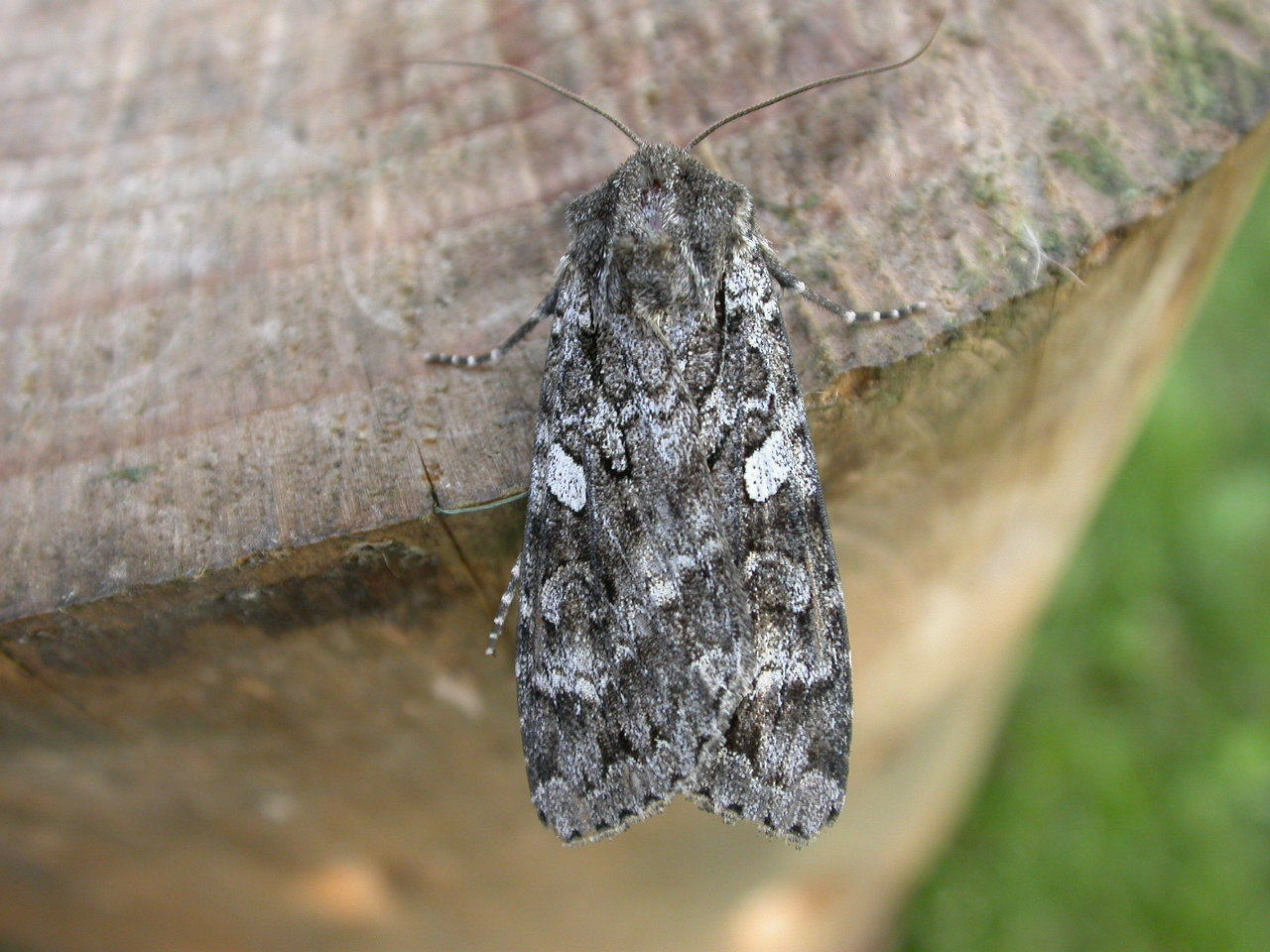
Great brocade

- Euxoa obelisca grisea, square-spot dart — south, west & north-east (Nationally Scarce B)
- Euxoa tritici, white-line dart — throughout ‡*
- Euxoa nigricans, garden dart — throughout ‡*
- Euxoa cursoria, coast dart — east, west-central & north (Nationally Scarce B)
- Agrotis graslini, Woods's dart — recently (2001) discovered on Jersey
- Agrotis cinerea, light feathered rustic — south & central (Nationally Scarce B)
- Agrotis vestigialis, Archer's dart — throughout (localized)
- [Agrotis spinifera, Gregson's dart — one specimen supposedly from Isle of Man ]
- Agrotis segetum, turnip moth — throughout
- Agrotis clavis, heart and club — throughout
- Agrotis exclamationis, heart and dart — throughout
- Agrotis trux lunigera, crescent dart — south-west & west-central (localized)
- Agrotis ipsilon, dark sword-grass — immigrant
- Agrotis herzogi, Spalding's dart — rare immigrant
- Agrotis puta, shuttle-shaped dart

- Agrotis puta puta — south & central
- Agrotis puta insula — Isles of Scilly

- Agrotis ripae, sand dart — south, central & north-east (Nationally Scarce B)
- Agrotis crassa, great dart — immigrant (formerly resident)
- Agrotis deprivata — ?recent rare immigrant
- [Feltia subgothica, Gothic dart — one dubious record of this North American species]
- [Feltia subterranea, tawny shoulder — likely imported or misidentified]
- Axylia putris, flame — throughout
- Actebia praecox, Portland moth — immigrant (Nationally Scarce B)
- Actebia fennica, Eversmann's rustic — rare immigrant
- Ochropleura flammatra, black collar — rare immigrant
- Ochropleura plecta, flame shoulder — throughout
- Ochropleura leucogaster, Radford's flame shoulder — immigrant
- Standfussiana lucernea, northern rustic — south, west-central & north (localized)
- Rhyacia simulans, dotted rustic — throughout
- Rhyacia lucipeta, southern rustic — probable rare immigrant (one record)
- Noctua pronuba, large yellow underwing — throughout
- Noctua orbona, lunar yellow underwing — throughout (Nationally Scarce B)
- Noctua comes, lesser yellow underwing — throughout
- Noctua fimbriata, broad-bordered yellow underwing — throughout
- Noctua janthina, Langmaid's yellow underwing — probable rare immigrant or resident
- Noctua janthe, lesser broad-bordered yellow underwing — throughout
- Noctua interjecta caliginosa, least yellow underwing — south & central
- Spaelotis ravida, stout dart — south & east-central (localized)
- Graphiphora augur, double dart — throughout ‡*
- Eugraphe subrosea, rosy marsh moth — west-central (Red Data Book)
- Protolampra sobrina, cousin German — north (Nationally Scarce A)
- Eugnorisma glareosa, autumnal rustic — throughout ‡*
- Eugnorisma depuncta, plain clay — north, west-central & south-west (Nationally Scarce B)
- Lycophotia porphyrea, true lover's knot — throughout
- Peridroma saucia, pearly underwing — immigrant & possible transitory resident
- Diarsia mendica, ingrailed clay

- Diarsia mendica mendica — throughout
- Diarsia mendica orkneyensis — Orkney
- Diarsia mendica thulei — Shetland

- Diarsia dahlii, barred chestnut — north, west-central & south-east (localized)
- Diarsia brunnea, purple clay — throughout
- Diarsia rubi, small square-spot — throughout ‡*
- Diarsia florida, fen square-spot — east-central, west-central & north (localized)
- Xestia alpicola alpina, northern dart — north (Nationally Scarce A)
- Xestia c-nigrum, setaceous Hebrew character — throughout
- Xestia ditrapezium, triple-spotted clay — throughout (localized)
- Xestia triangulum, double square-spot —throughout
- Xestia ashworthii, Ashworth's rustic — west-central (Nationally Scarce A)
- Xestia baja, dotted clay — throughout
- Xestia rhomboidea, square-spotted clay — throughout (Nationally Scarce B)
- Xestia castanea, neglected rustic — throughout (localized) ‡*
- Xestia sexstrigata, six-striped rustic — throughout
- Xestia xanthographa, square-spot rustic — throughout
- Xestia agathina, heath rustic ‡*

- Xestia agathina agathina — throughout (localized)
- Xestia agathina hebridicola — Hebrides

- Naenia typica, Gothic — throughout (localized)
- Eurois occulta, great brocade — immigrant (Nationally Scarce B)
- Anaplectoides prasina, green arches — throughout
- Cerastis rubricosa, red chestnut — throughout
- Cerastis leucographa, white-marked — south & central (localized)
- Mesogona acetosellae, pale stigma — rare immigrant

== Subfamily Hadeninae ==
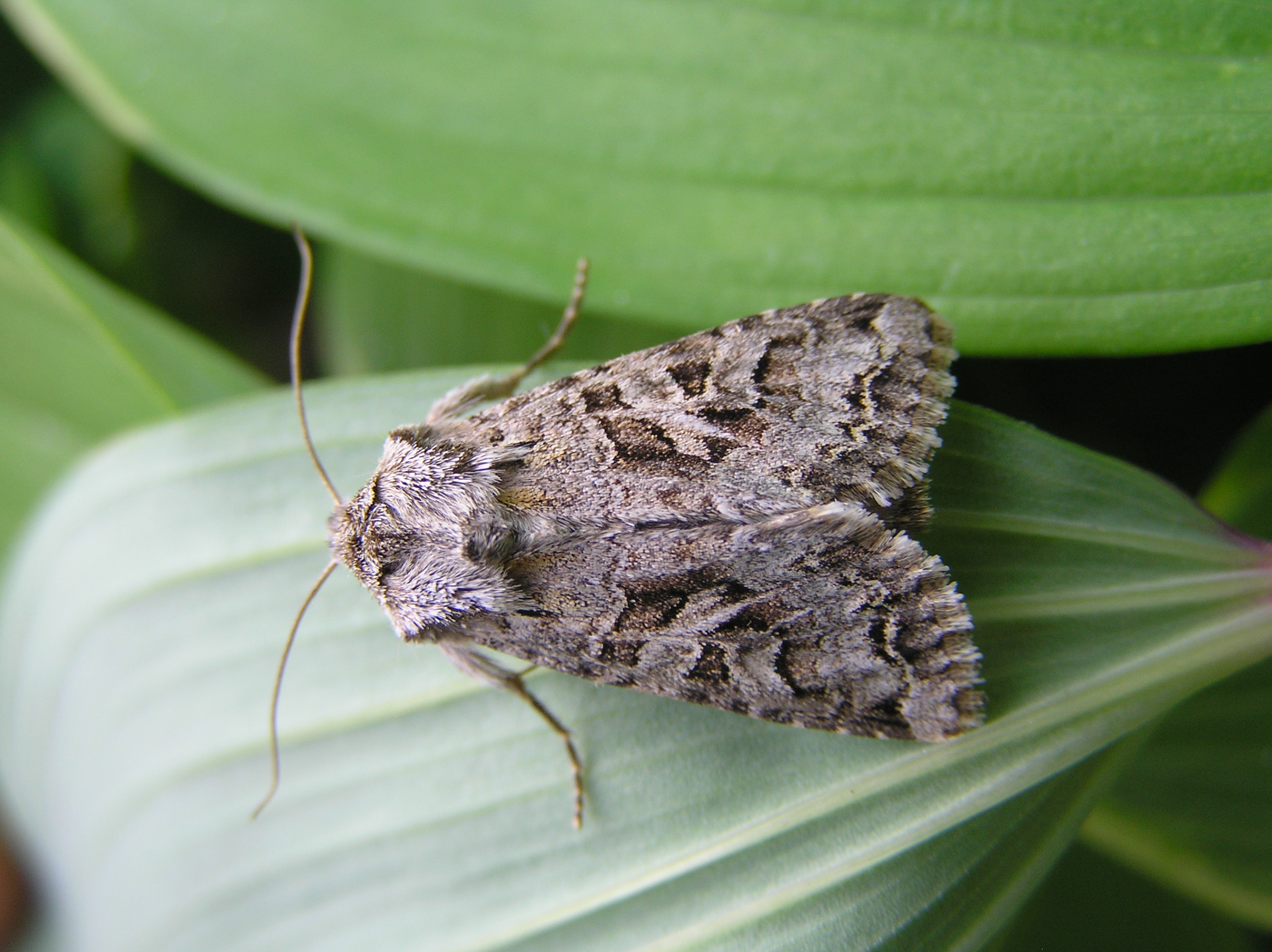
Shears

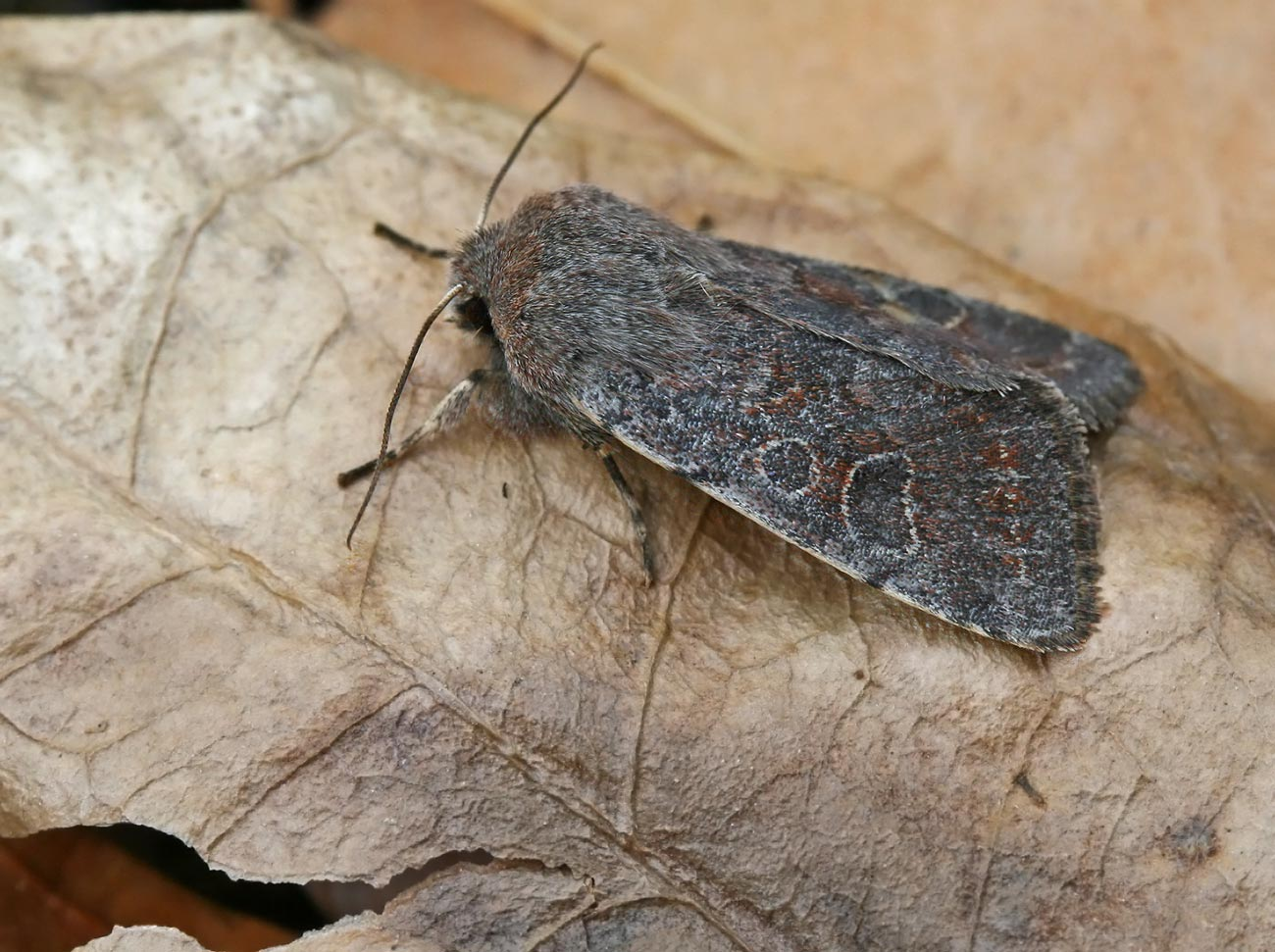
Lead-coloured drab

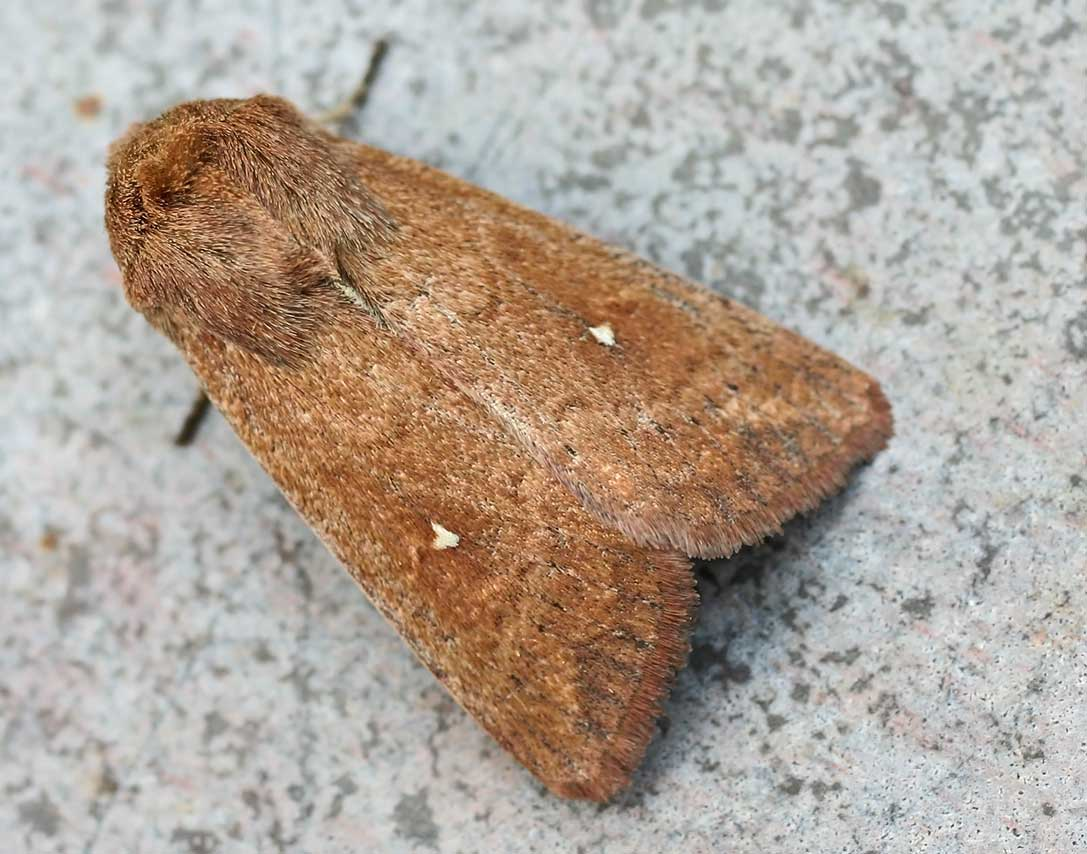
White-point

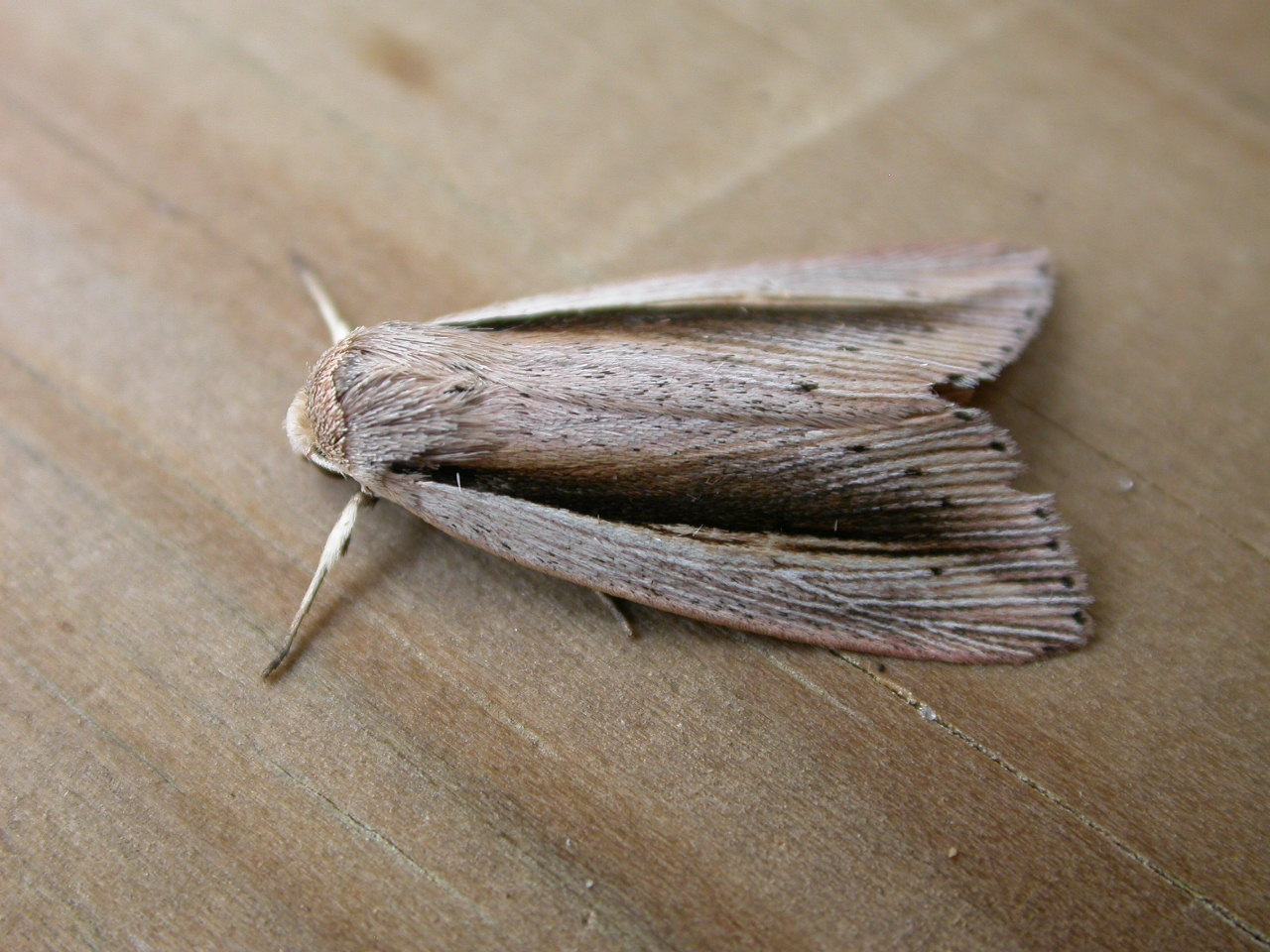
Flame wainscot

- Anarta myrtilli, beautiful yellow underwing — throughout
- Anarta cordigera, small dark yellow underwing — north-east (Nationally Scarce A) ‡
- Anarta melanopa, broad-bordered white underwing — north (Red Data Book)
- Discestra trifolii, nutmeg — throughout
- [Lacinipolia renigera, kidney-spotted minor — dubious old record]
- Lacinipolia laudabilis — ?recent rare immigrant
- Hada plebeja, shears — throughout
- Polia bombycina, pale shining brown — south (proposed Red Data Book)
- Polia trimaculosa, silvery arches — throughout (Nationally Scarce B)
- Polia nebulosa, grey arches — throughout
- Pachetra sagittigera britannica, feathered ear — south (presumed extinct)
- Sideridis albicolon, white colon — south, central & north-east (Nationally Scarce B)
- Heliophobus reticulata marginosa, bordered Gothic — south & east-central (proposed Red Data Book)
- Mamestra brassicae, cabbage moth — throughout
- Melanchra persicariae, dot moth — south, central & north ‡*
- Melanchra pisi, broom moth — throughout ‡*
- Lacanobia contigua, beautiful brocade — throughout (localized)
- Lacanobia w-latinum, light brocade — throughout (localized)
- Lacanobia thalassina, pale-shouldered brocade — throughout
- Lacanobia suasa, dog's tooth — south & central (localized)
- Lacanobia oleracea, bright-line brown-eye — throughout
- Lacanobia blenna, stranger — rare immigrant & temporary resident
- Papestra biren, glaucous shears — south-west, west-central & north (localized)
- Hecatera bicolorata, broad-barred white — throughout
- Hecatera dysodea, small ranunculus — south-east & south Wales
- Hadena rivularis, campion — throughout
- Hadena perplexa

- Hadena perplexa perplexa, tawny shears — south & central
- Hadena perplexa capsophila, pod lover — south-west, west-central, north-west & Isle of Man (localized)

- Hadena irregularis, viper's bugloss — presumed extinct
- Hadena luteago barrettii, Barrett's marbled coronet — south-west (Nationally Scarce B)
- Hadena compta, varied coronet — south-east, south & east-central
- Hadena confusa, marbled coronet — throughout (localized)
- Hadena albimacula, white spot — south (Red Data Book)
- Hadena bicruris, lychnis — throughout
- Hadena caesia mananii, grey — north-west & Isle of Man (Red Data Book)
- Eriopygodes imbecilla, Silurian — south-west (Red Data Book)
- Cerapteryx graminis, antler — throughout
- Tholera cespitis, hedge rustic — throughout ‡*
- Tholera decimalis, feathered Gothic — throughout ‡*
- Panolis flammea, pine beauty — throughout
- [Xanthopastis timais, Spanish moth — dubious specimen]
- [Brithys crini pancratii, Kew arches — probable import]
- Egira conspicillaris, silver cloud — south-west (Nationally Scarce A)
- Orthosia cruda, small Quaker — throughout
- Orthosia miniosa, blossom underwing — south & west-central (localized) & occasional immigrant
- Orthosia opima, northern drab — throughout (localized)
- Orthosia populeti, lead-coloured drab — throughout (localized)
- Orthosia gracilis, powdered Quaker — throughout ‡*
- Orthosia cerasi, common Quaker — throughout
- Orthosia incerta, clouded drab — throughout
- Orthosia munda, twin-spotted Quaker — south, central & north
- Orthosia gothica, Hebrew character — throughout
- Mythimna turca, double line — south-west & south-east (Nationally Scarce B)
- Mythimna conigera, brown-line bright eye — throughout
- Mythimna ferrago, clay — throughout
- Mythimna albipuncta, white-point — immigrant & recent colonist (south & south-east coasts)
- Mythimna vitellina, delicate — immigrant
- Mythimna pudorina, striped wainscot — south & central (localized)
- Mythimna straminea, southern wainscot — south & central (localized)
- Mythimna impura, smoky wainscot — throughout
- Mythimna pallens, common wainscot — throughout
- Mythimna favicolor, Mathew's wainscot — south & south-east (Nationally Scarce B)
- Mythimna litoralis, shore wainscot — south, central & north-east (Nationally Scarce B)
- Mythimna l-album, l-album wainscot — immigrant to south (Nationally Scarce B)
- Mythimna riparia, oblique wainscot — immigrant
- Mythimna unipuncta, white-speck — immigrant & possible transitory resident
- Mythimna obsoleta, obscure wainscot — south, east-central & west-central (localized)
- Mythimna comma, shoulder-striped wainscot — throughout ‡*
- Mythimna putrescens, Devonshire wainscot — south-west (Nationally Scarce A)
- [Mythimna commoides — probable import or hoax]
- Mythimna loreyi, cosmopolitan — immigrant
- Mythimna flammea, flame wainscot — south-east & south (Nationally Scarce A)
- [Graphania dives, Maori — probable import]

== Subfamily Cuculliinae ==
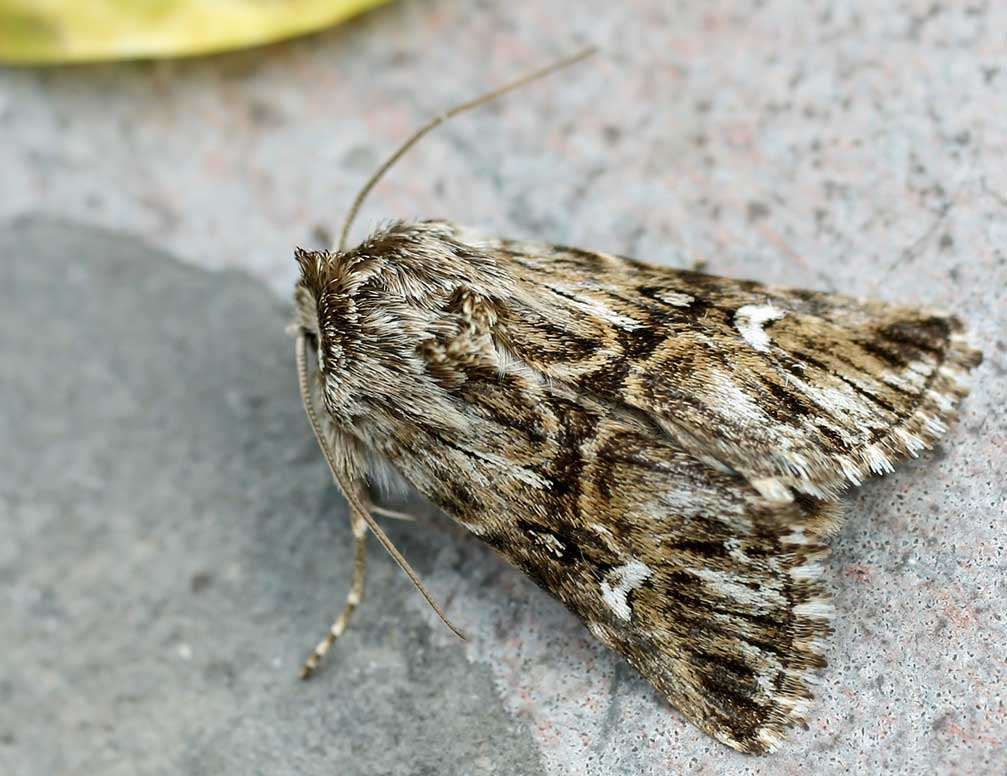
Toadflax brocade

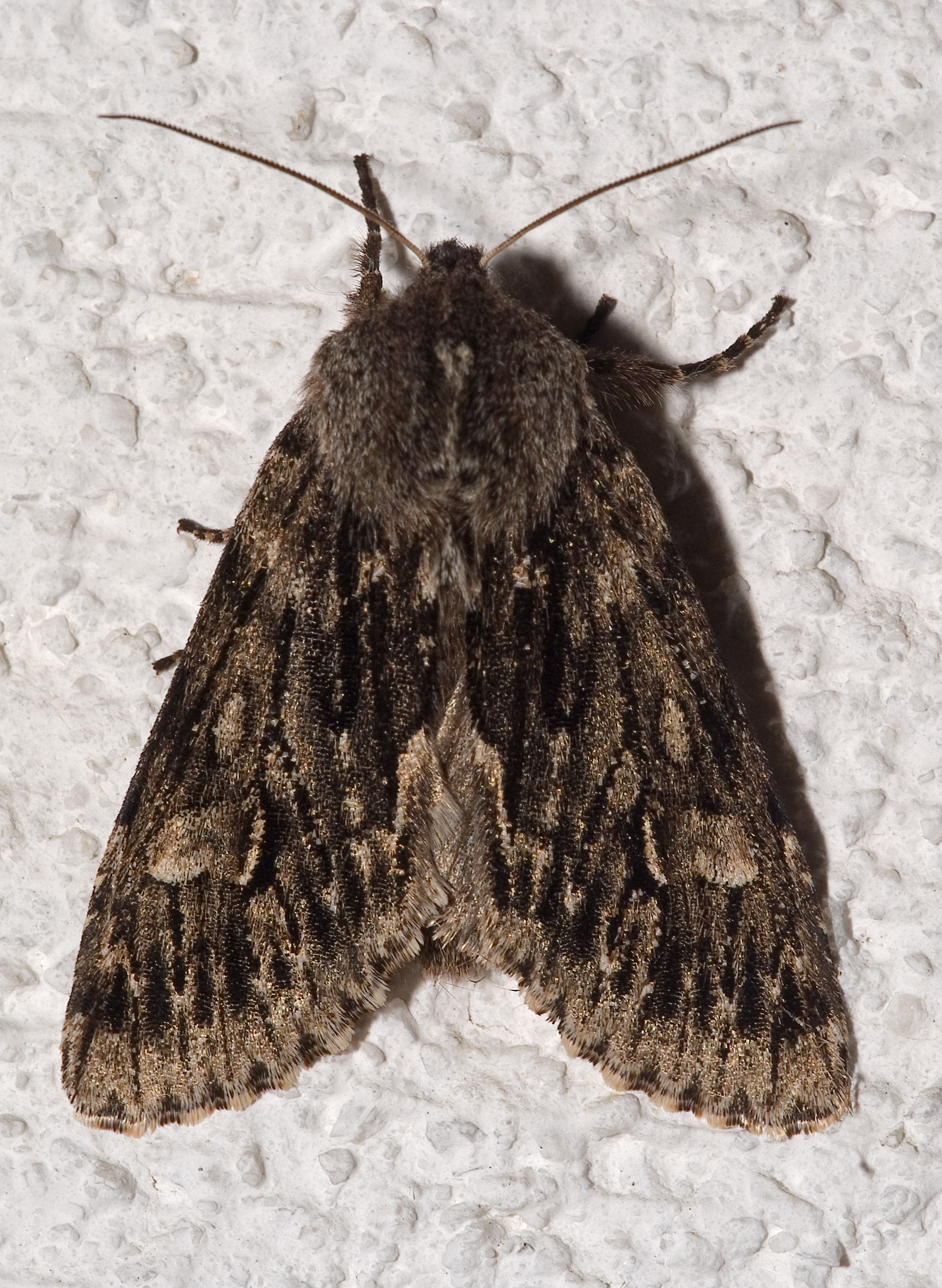
Rannock sprawler

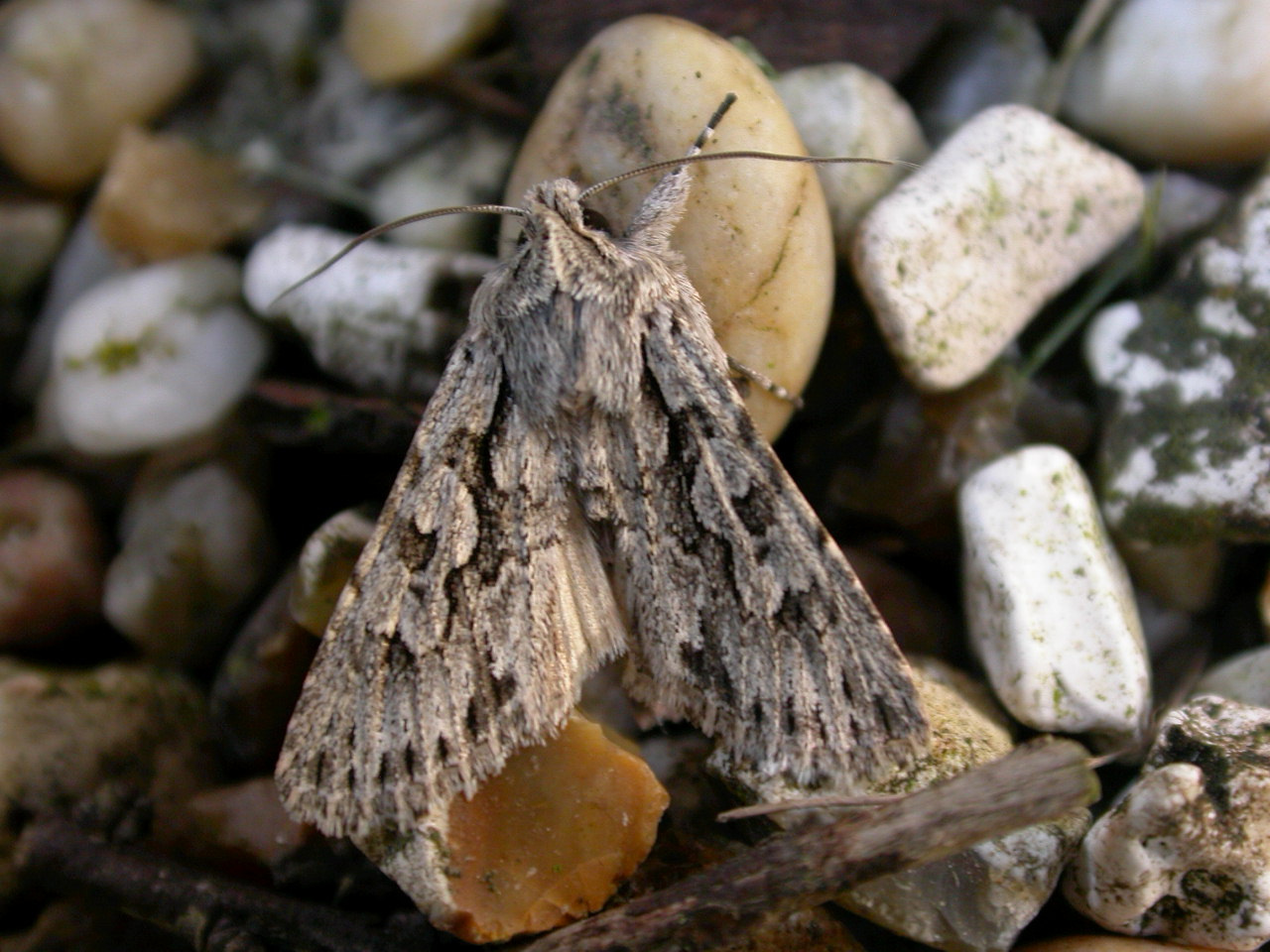
Early grey

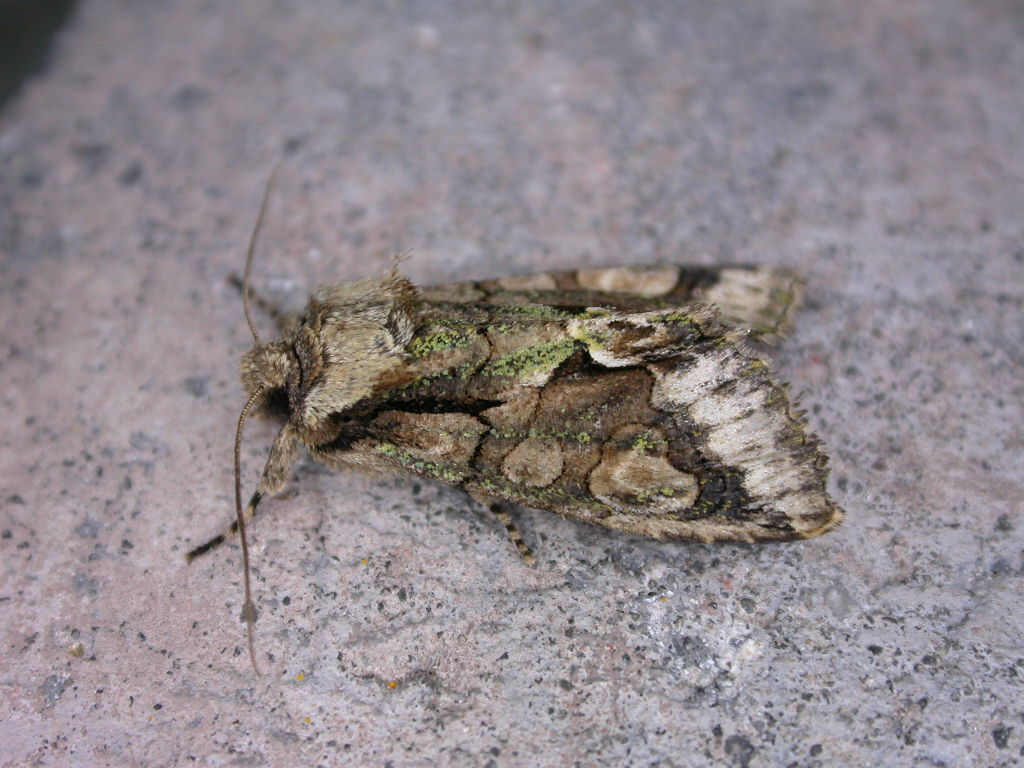
Green-brindled crescent

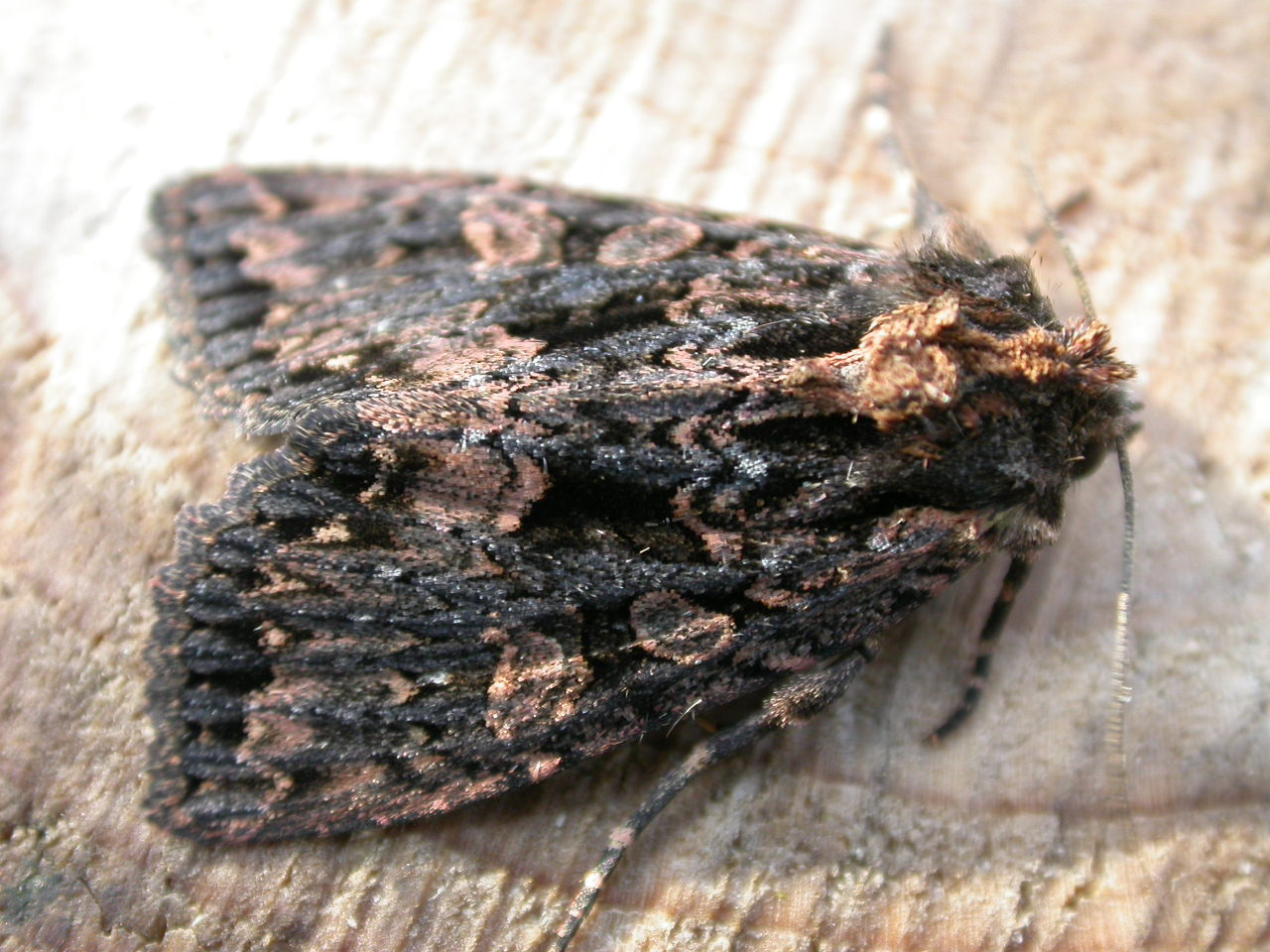
Beautiful arches

- Cucullia absinthii, wormwood — south & central (Nationally Scarce B)
- [Cucullia argentea, green silver-spangled shark — two specimens of dubious origin]
- Cucullia artemisiae, scarce wormwood — rare immigrant
- Cucullia chamomillae, chamomile shark — south, central & north (localized)
- [Cucullia lactucae, lettuce shark — several dubious records]
- Cucullia umbratica, shark — throughout
- Cucullia asteris, star-wort — south & central (Nationally Scarce B)
- Cucullia gnaphalii occidentalis, cudweed — presumed extinct
- Shargacucullia lychnitis, striped lychnis — south (Nationally Scarce A)
- Shargacucullia scrophulariae, water betony — rare immigrant
- Shargacucullia verbasci, mullein — south & central
- [Shargacucullia prenanthis, false water betony — inclusion on British list presumed in error]
- [Shargacucullia caninae — single record of caterpillars]
- Calophasia lunula, toadflax brocade — south-east (Red Data Book)
- Calophasia platyptera, antirrhinum brocade — probable rare immigrant
- Brachylomia viminalis, minor shoulder-knot — throughout ‡*
- Leucochlaena oditis, beautiful Gothic — south (Red Data Book)
- Brachionycha sphinx, sprawler — south & central ‡*
- Brachionycha nubeculosa, Rannoch sprawler — north (Red Data Book)
- Dasypolia templi, brindled ochre — north, central & south-west (localized) ‡*
- Aporophyla australis pascuea, feathered brindle — south (Nationally Scarce B)
- Aporophyla lutulenta, deep-brown dart — south & central ‡*
- Aporophyla lueneburgensis, northern deep-brown dart — north & west-central
- Aporophyla nigra, black rustic — north, south, west-central & east-central
- Lithomoia solidaginis, golden-rod brindle — north & west-central (localized)
- [Scotochrosta pulla, ash shoulder-knot — probable fraud]
- [Copipanolis styracis, fawn sallow — probable import]
- Lithophane semibrunnea, tawny pinion — south (localized)
- Lithophane hepatica, pale pinion — south & central (localized)
- Lithophane ornitopus lactipennis, grey shoulder-knot — south & west-central
- Lithophane furcifera, conformist

- Lithophane furcifera furcifera — immigrant
- Lithophane furcifera suffusa — presumed extinct

- Lithophane consocia — probable rare immigrant
- Lithophane lamda, nonconformist — immigrant
- Lithophane leautieri hesperica, Blair's shoulder-knot — south & central
- Xylena vetusta, red sword-grass — north, west & south (localized)
- Xylena exsoleta, sword-grass — north & central (Nationally Scarce B)
- Xylocampa areola, early grey — throughout
- Meganephria bimaculosa, double-spot brocade — possible immigrant (otherwise import)
- Allophyes oxyacanthae, green-brindled crescent — throughout ‡*
- [Valeria oleagina, green-brindled dot — dubious record]
- Dryobota labecula, oak rustic — probably rare immigrant
- Dichonia aprilina, merveille du jour — throughout
- Dryobotodes eremita, brindled green — throughout
- Blepharita satura, beautiful arches — presumed extinct
- Blepharita adusta, dark brocade — throughout ‡*
- Blepharita solieri, bedrule brocade — rare immigrant
- Antitype chi, grey chi — north, central & south
- Trigonophora flammea, flame brocade — immigrant & transitory resident
- Polymixis flavicincta, large ranunculus — south & east-central (localized)
- Polymixis gemmea, cameo probable rare immigrant
- Polymixis xanthomista statices, black-banded — south-west (Nationally Scarce A)
- Polymixis lichenea, feathered ranunculus

- Polymixis lichenea lichenea — south & central (localized)
- Polymixis lichenea scillonea — Isles of Scilly

== Subfamily Acronictinae ==
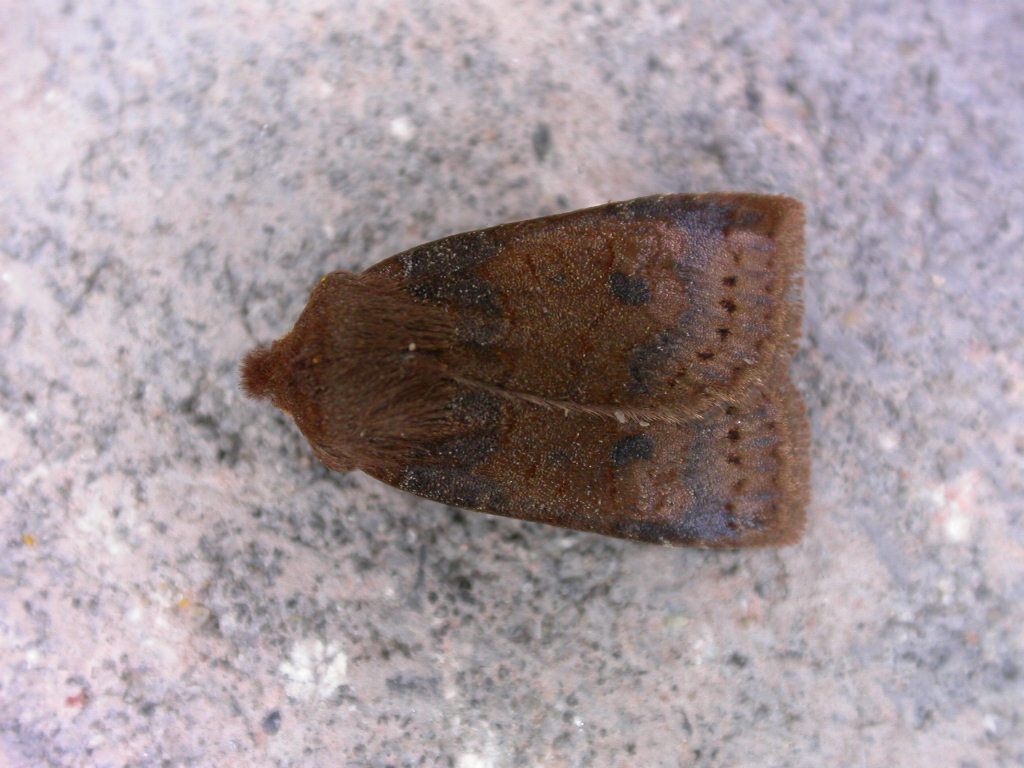
Chestnut

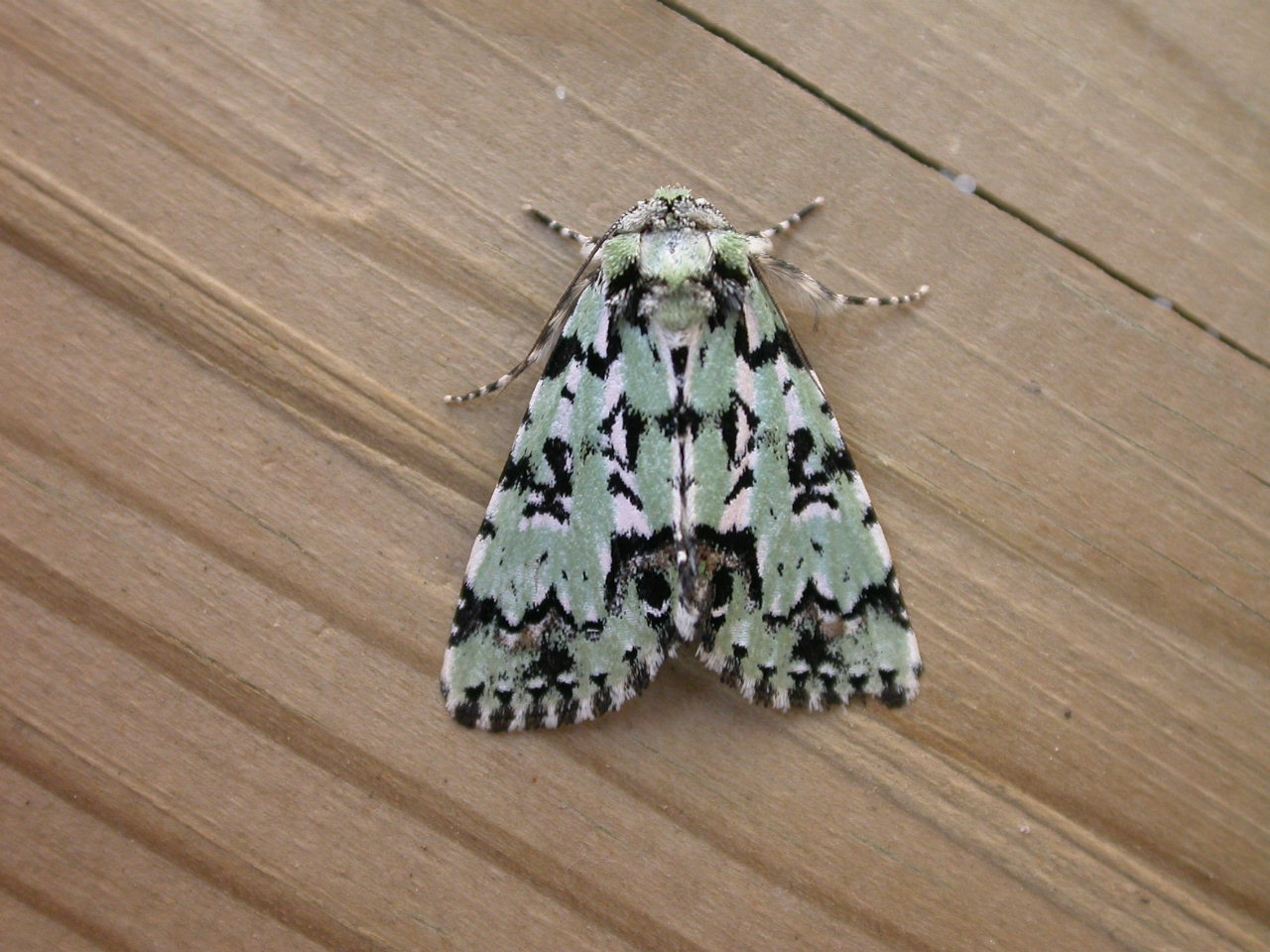
Scarce merveille du jour

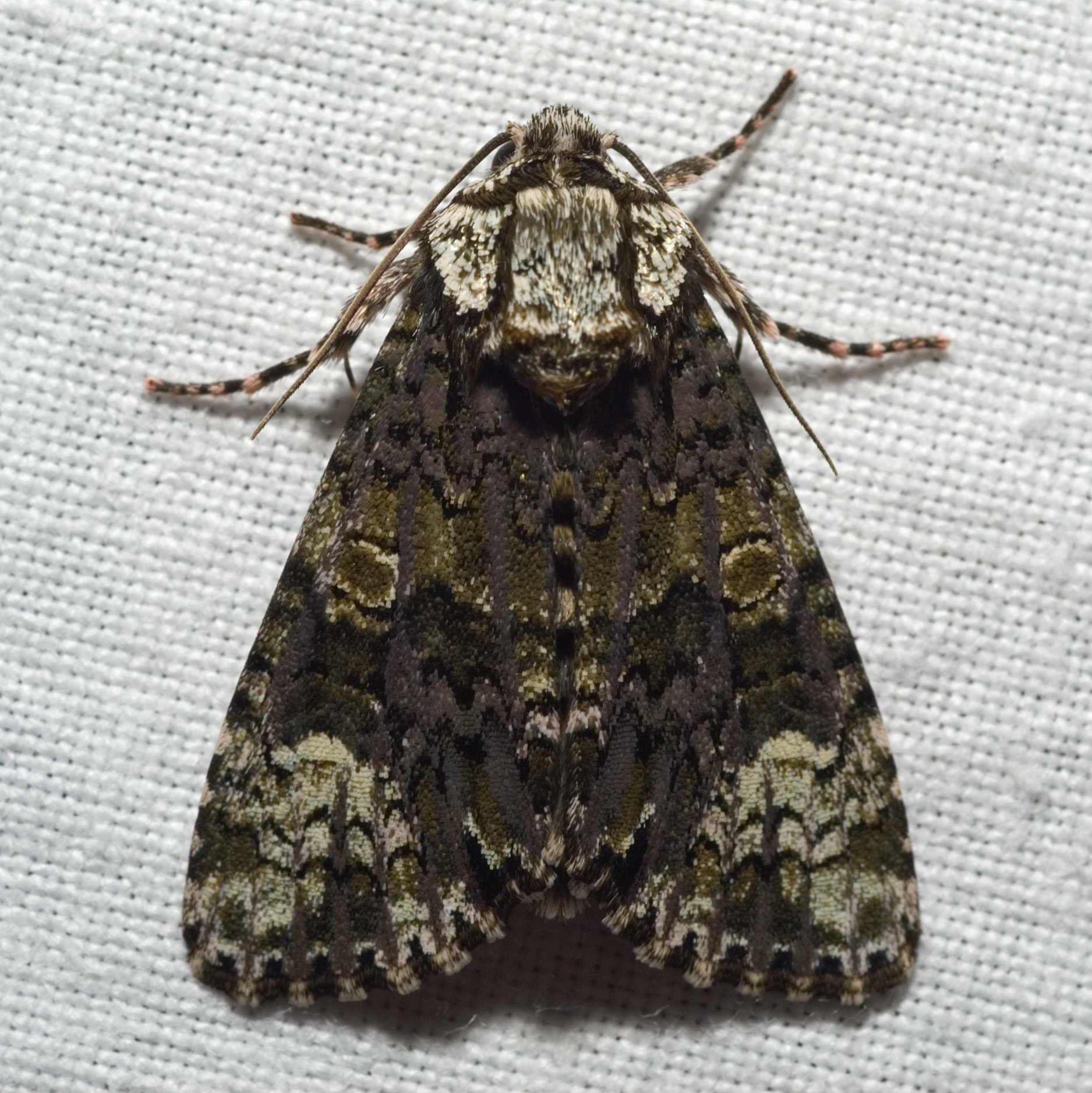
Coronet

- Eupsilia transversa, satellite — throughout
- Jodia croceago, orange upperwing — formerly south (Red Data Book); now rare immigrant
- Conistra vaccinii, chestnut — throughout
- Conistra ligula, dark chestnut — south, central & north
- Conistra rubiginea, dotted chestnut — south-west & south (Nationally Scarce B)
- Conistra erythrocephala, red-headed chestnut — rare immigrant & transitory resident
- Agrochola circellaris, brick — throughout
- Agrochola lota, red-line Quaker — throughout
- Agrochola macilenta, yellow-line Quaker — throughout
- Agrochola haematidea, southern chestnut — south & south-east (Red Data Book)
- Agrochola helvola, flounced chestnut — throughout ‡*
- Agrochola litura, brown-spot pinion — throughout ‡*
- Agrochola lychnidis, beaded chestnut — south, central & north ‡*
- Atethmia centrago, centre-barred sallow — throughout ‡*
- Omphaloscelis lunosa, lunar underwing — throughout
- Xanthia citrago, orange sallow — throughout
- Xanthia aurago, barred sallow — south, central & north
- Xanthia togata, pink-barred sallow — throughout
- Xanthia icteritia, sallow — throughout ‡*
- Xanthia gilvago, dusky-lemon sallow — south, central & north (localized) ‡*
- Xanthia ocellaris, pale-lemon sallow — south-east (Nationally Scarce A)
- Moma alpium, scarce merveille du jour — south (Red Data Book)
- Acronicta megacephala, poplar grey — throughout
- Acronicta aceris, sycamore — south & east-central (localized)
- Acronicta leporina, miller — throughout
- Acronicta alni, alder moth — south & central (localized)
- [Acronicta cuspis, large dagger — unconfirmed record]
- Acronicta tridens, dark dagger — south, central & north
- Acronicta psi, grey dagger — throughout ‡*
- Acronicta strigosa, marsh dagger — rare immigrant (formerly resident)
- Acronicta menyanthidis, light knot grass

- Acronicta menyanthidis menyanthidis — north, west & east-central (localized)
- Acronicta menyanthidis scotica — north (localized)

- Acronicta auricoma, scarce dagger — rare immigrant (formerly resident)
- Acronicta euphorbiae myricae, sweet gale moth — north (Nationally Scarce A)
- Acronicta rumicis, knot grass — throughout ‡*
- Simyra albovenosa, reed dagger — south-east (Nationally Scarce B)
- Craniophora ligustri, coronet — throughout (localized)

== Subfamily Bryophilinae ==
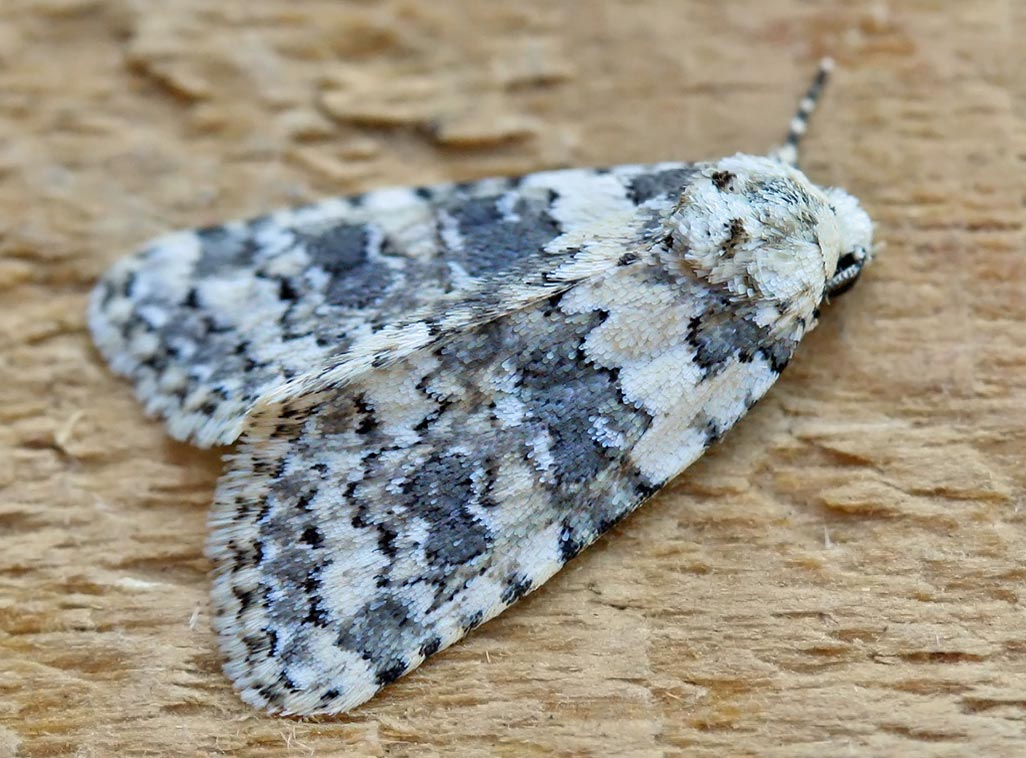
Marbled beauty

- Cryphia algae, tree-lichen beauty — immigrant
- Cryphia domestica, marbled beauty — throughout
- Cryphia raptricula, marbled grey — immigrant
- Cryphia muralis, marbled green — south (localized)

== Subfamily Amphipyrinae ==
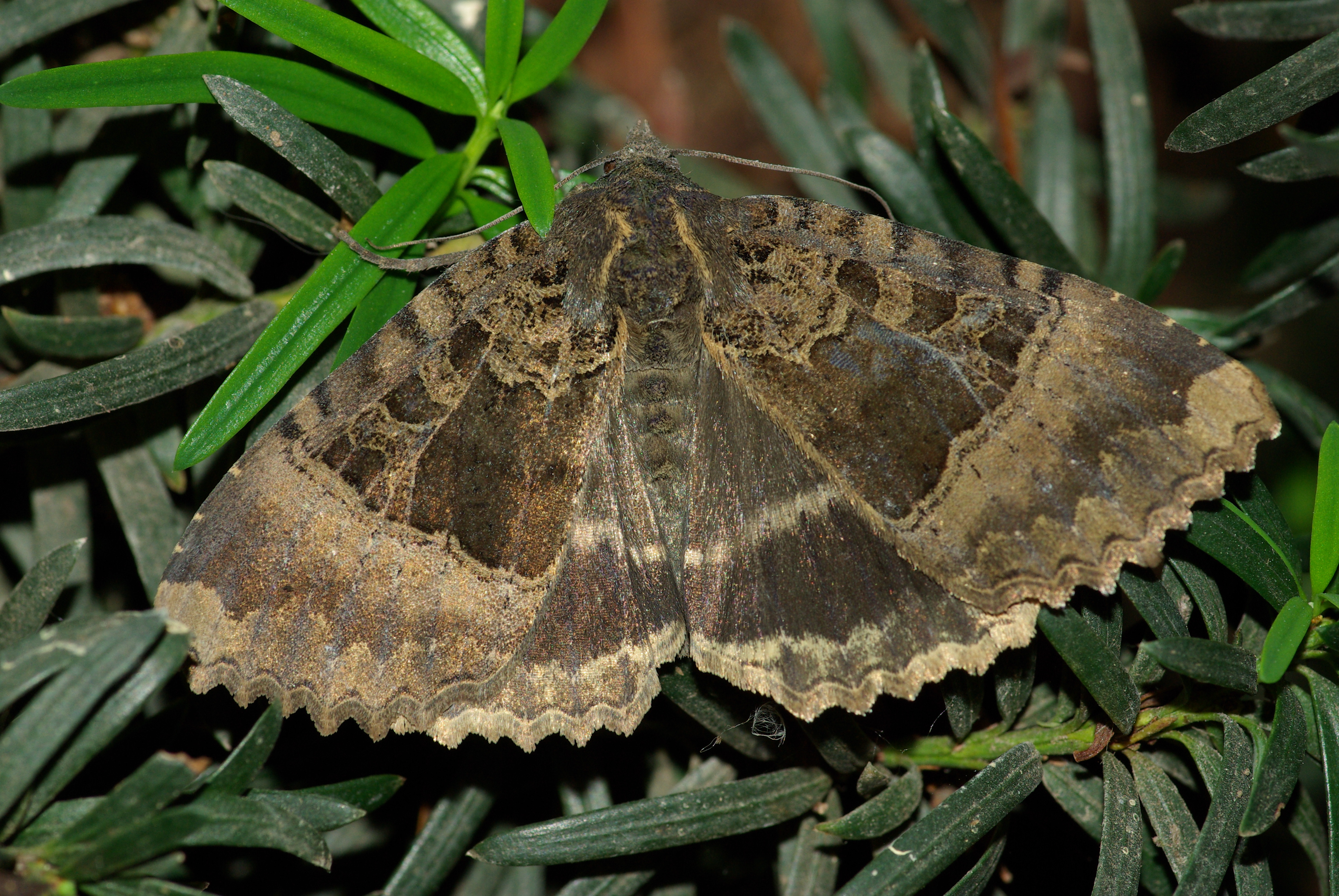
Old lady

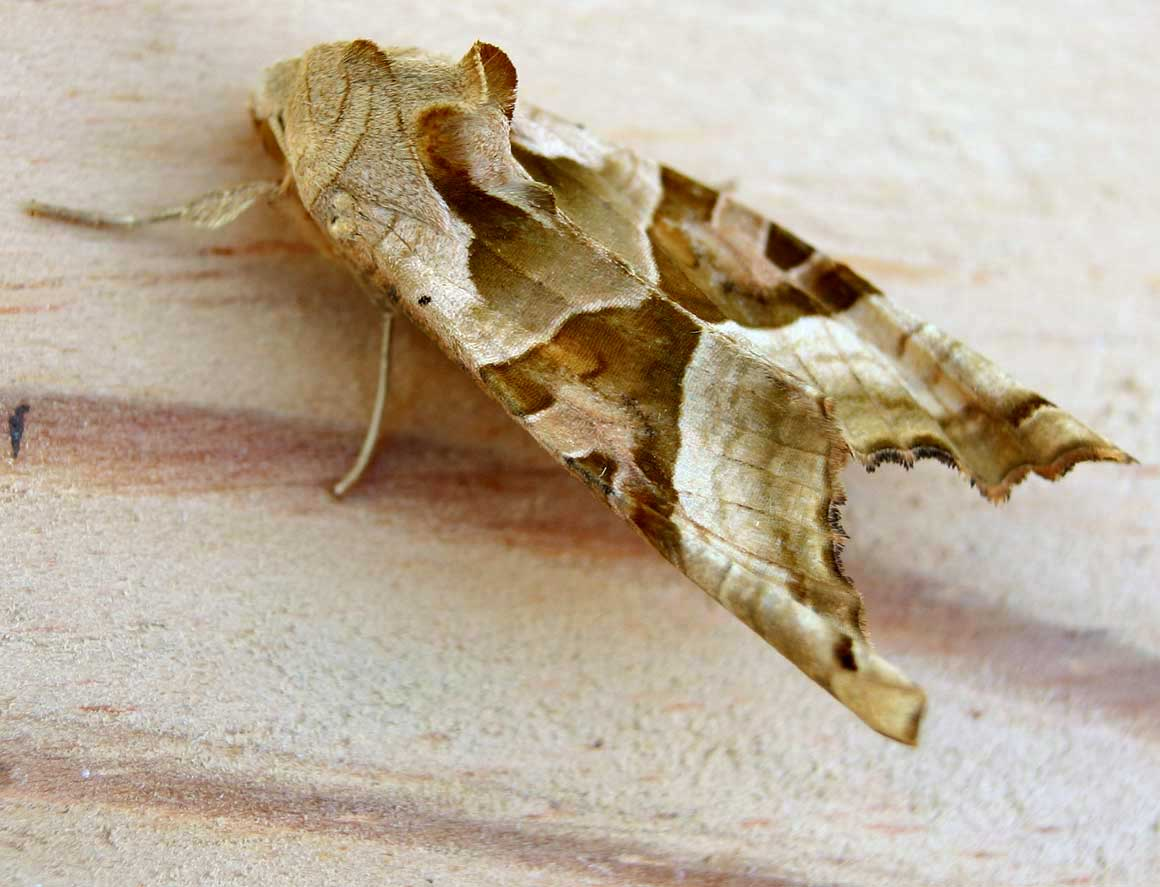
Angle shades

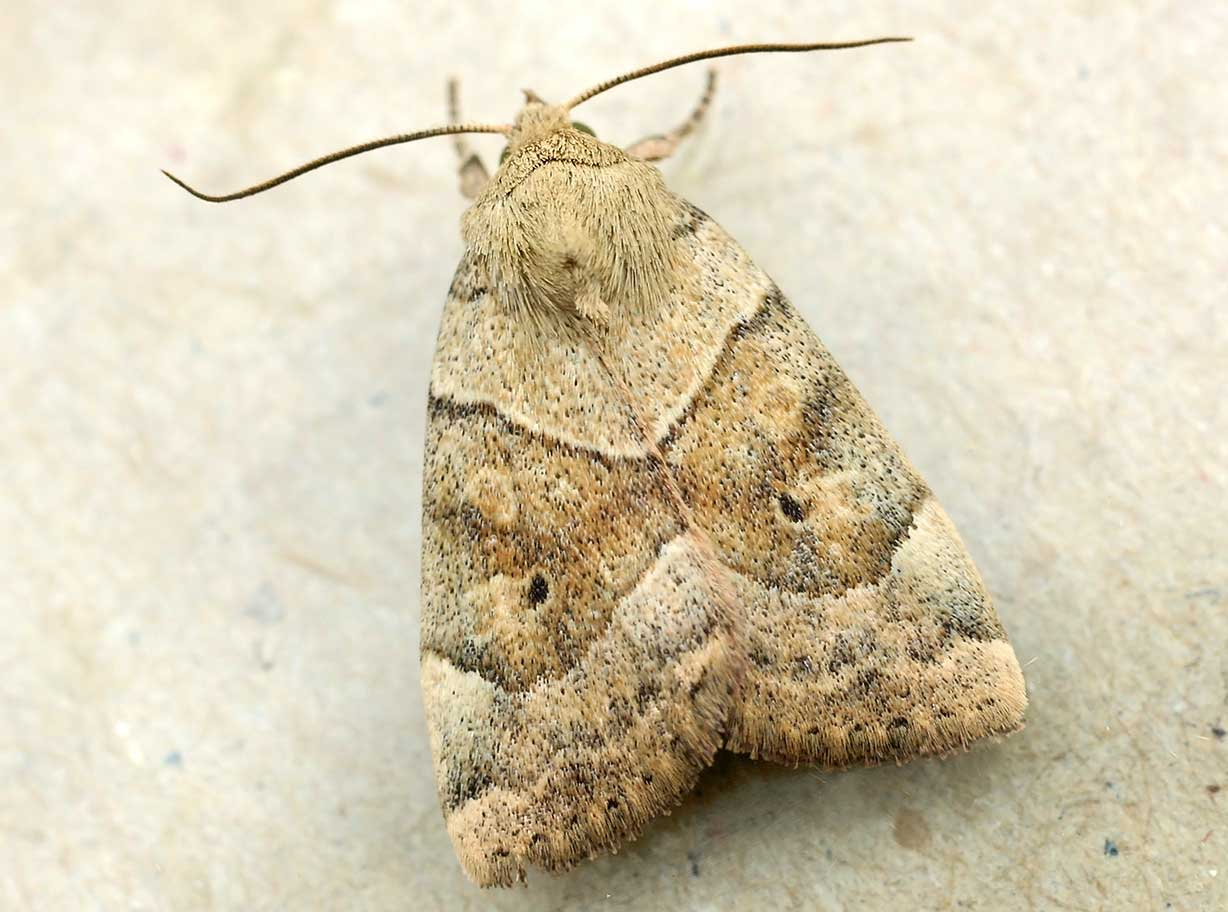
Dun-bar

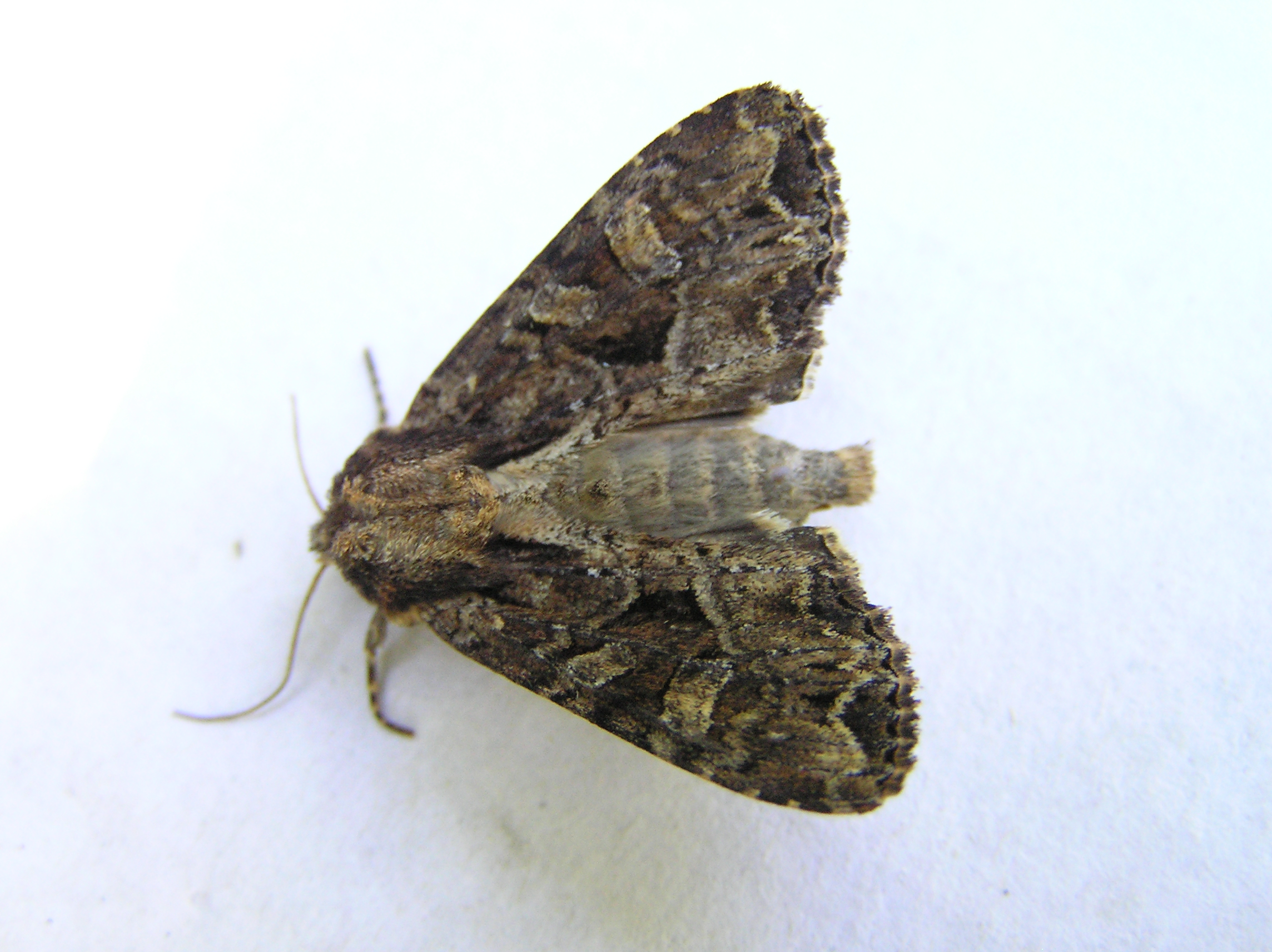
Dusky brocade

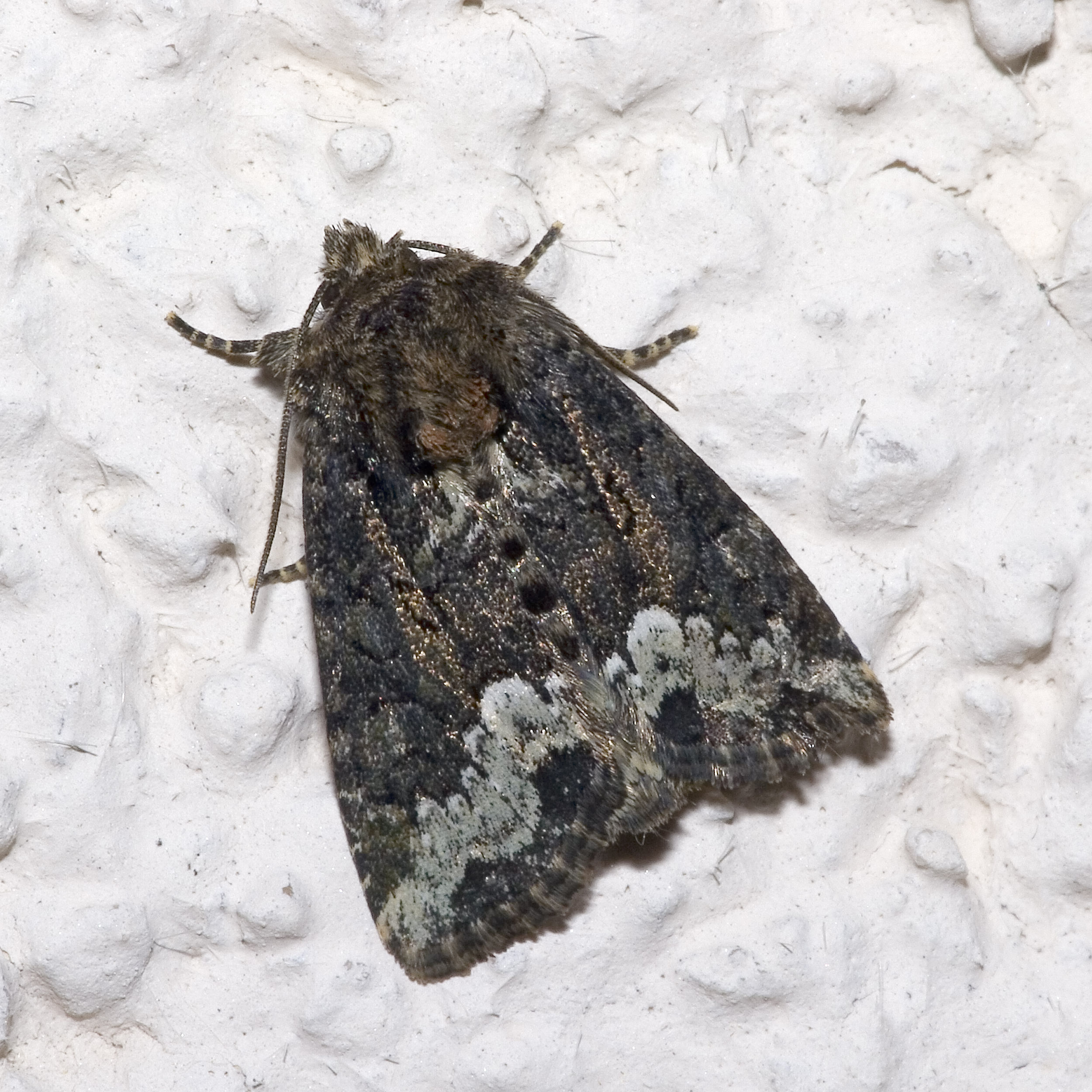
Marbled minor

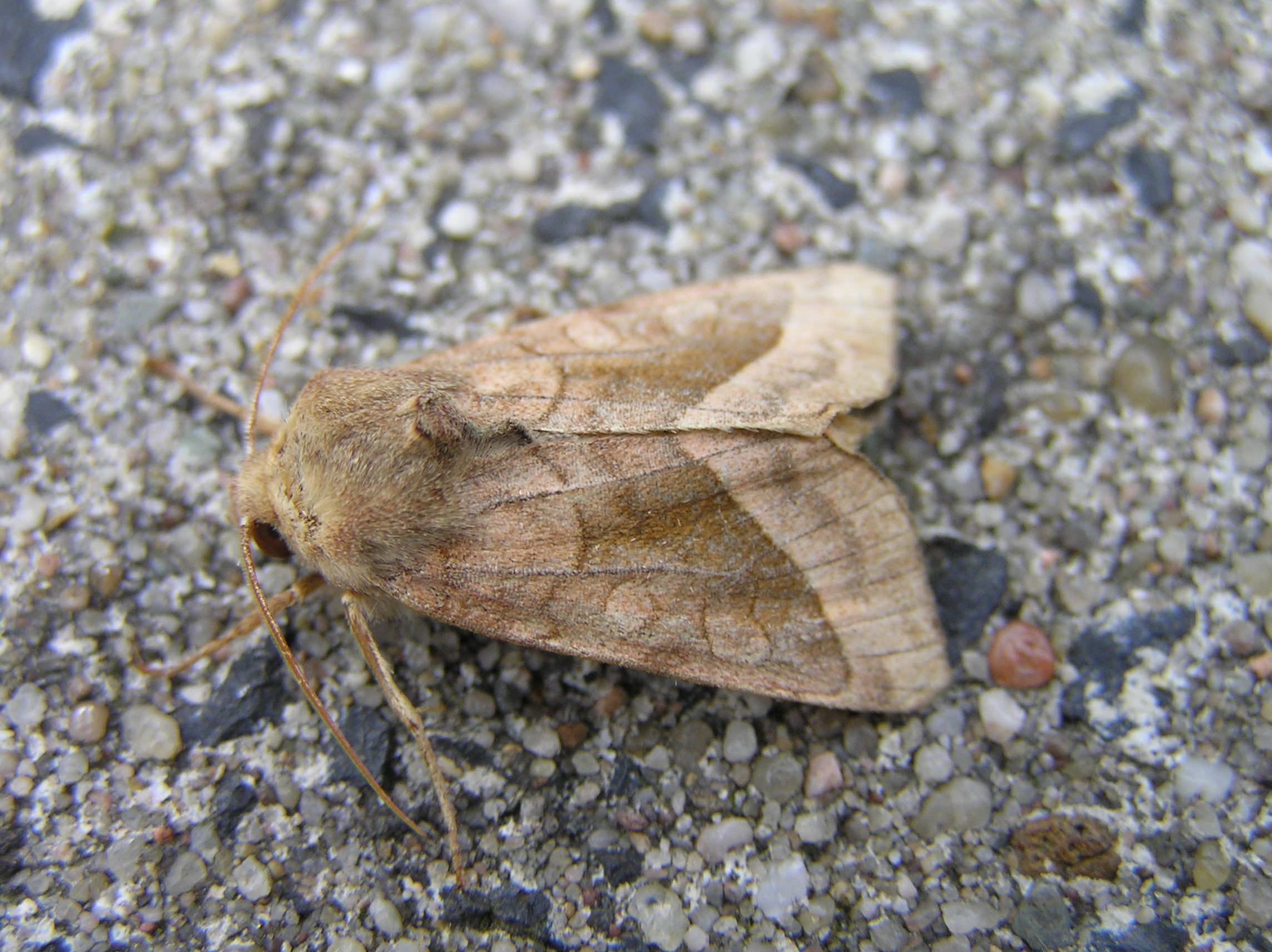
Rosy rustic

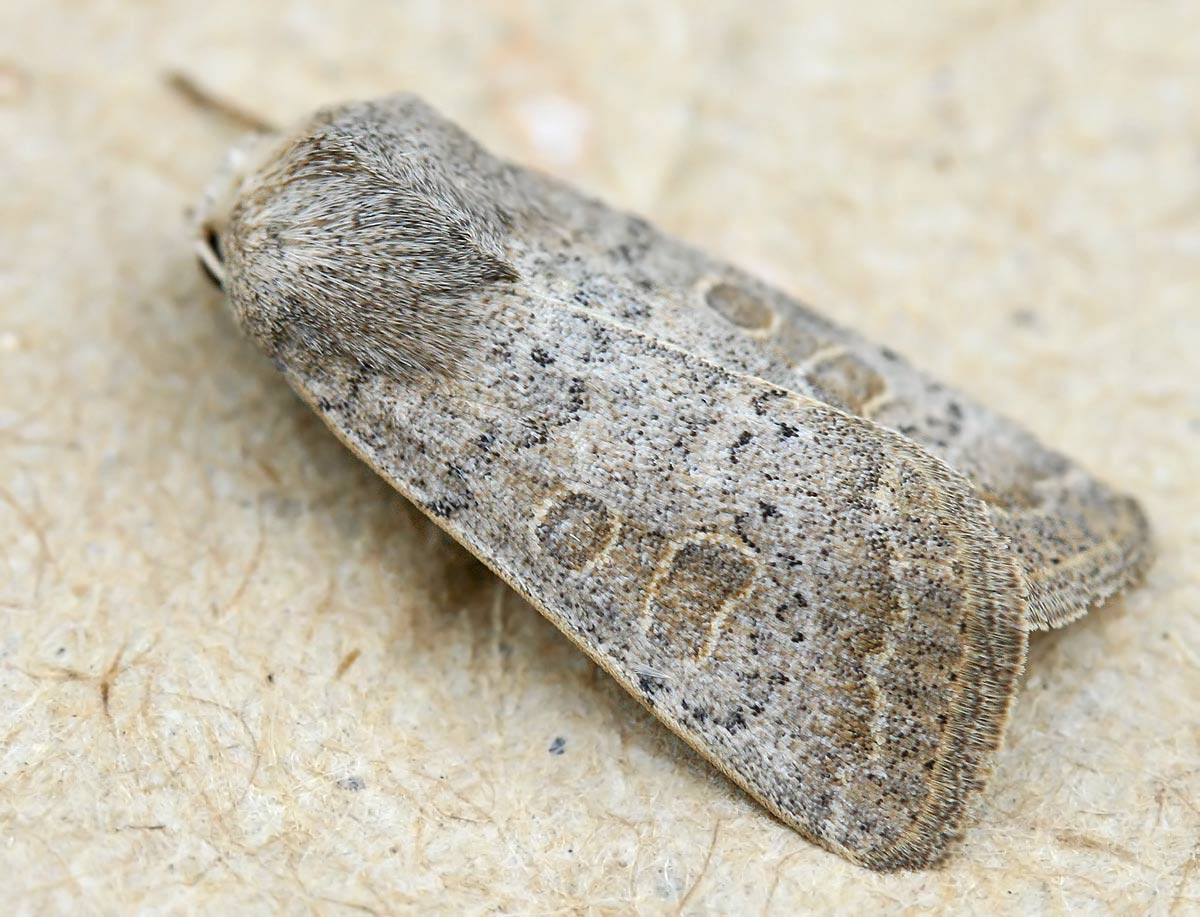
Rustic

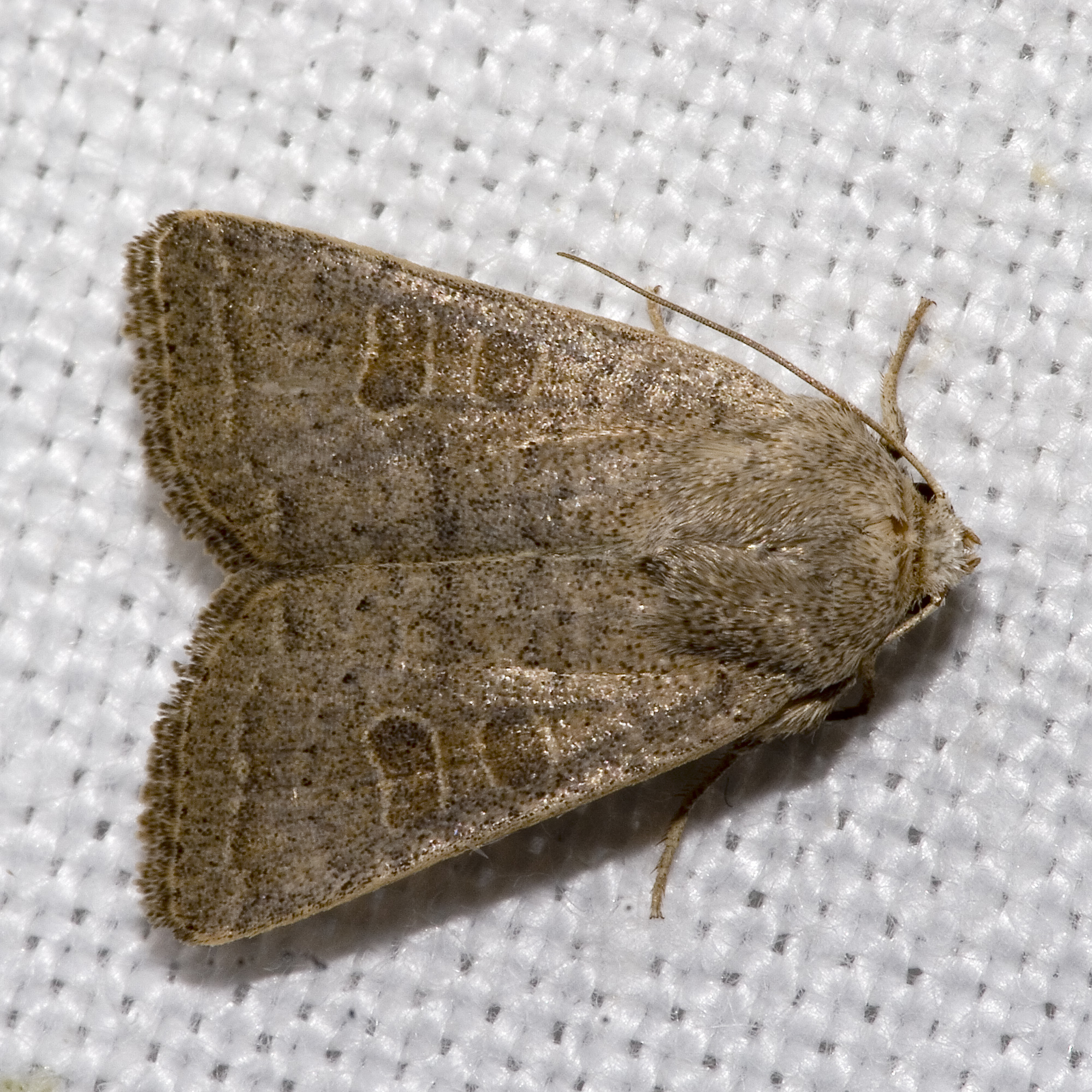
Vine's rustic

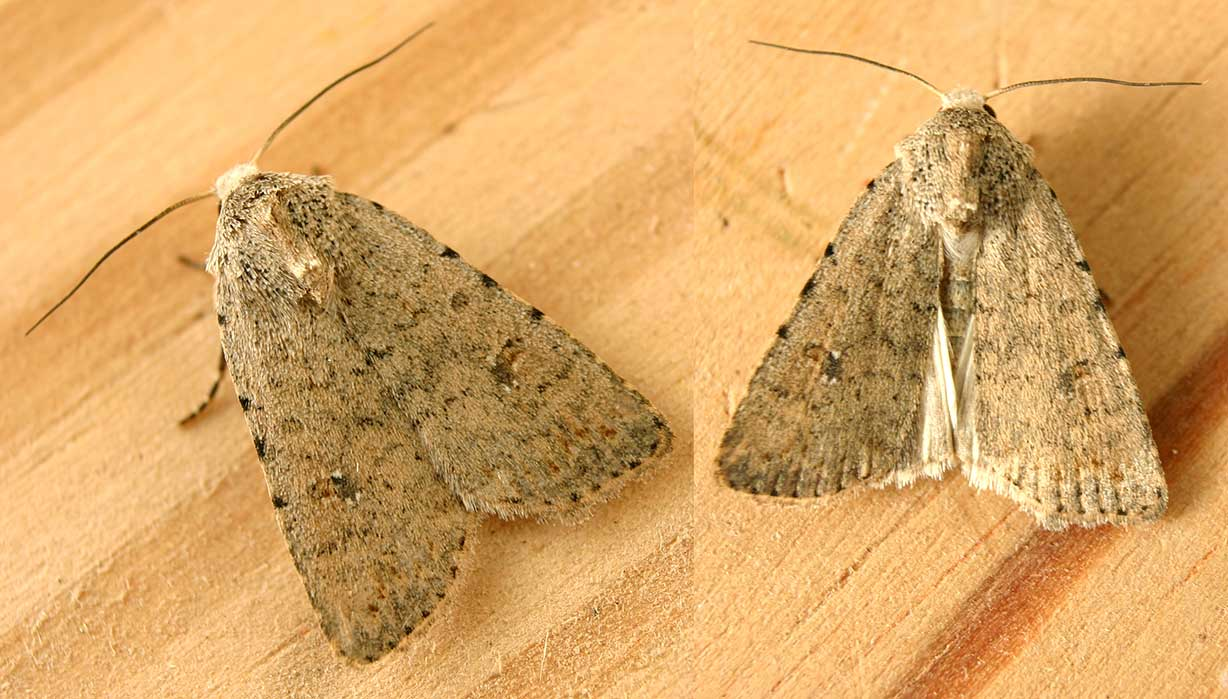
Pale mottled willow

- Amphipyra pyramidea, copper underwing — south, central & north
- Amphipyra berbera svenssoni, Svensson's copper underwing — south & central
- Amphipyra tragopoginis, mouse moth — throughout ‡*
- Mormo maura, old lady — throughout (localized)
- Dypterygia scabriuscula, bird's wing — south-east & west-central (localized)
- Rusina ferruginea, brown rustic — throughout
- Thalpophila matura, straw underwing — south, central & north
- Trachea atriplicis, orache moth — rare immigrant (formerly resident)
- Euplexia lucipara, small angle shades — throughout
- Phlogophora meticulosa, angle shades — throughout
- Actinotia polyodon, purple cloud — immigrant
- Actinotia hyperici, pale-shouldered cloud — rare immigrant
- Pseudenargia ulicis, Berber — probable rare immigrant (one record)
- Callopistria juventina, Latin — rare immigrant
- [Callopistria latreillei — one recorded caterpillar of uncertain origin]
- [Eucarta amethystina, Cumberland gem — unconfirmed record]
- Ipimorpha retusa, double kidney — south & central (localized)
- Ipimorpha subtusa, olive — south, central & north (localized)
- Enargia paleacea, angle-striped sallow — probable immigrant to central & north (Nationally Scarce B)
- Parastichtis suspecta, suspected — throughout
- Parastichtis ypsillon, dingy shears — south, central & north (localized)
- Dicycla oo, heart moth — south (Red Data Book)
- Cosmia affinis, lesser-spotted pinion — south & central (localized)
- Cosmia diffinis, white-spotted pinion — south & central (proposed Red Data Book)
- Cosmia trapezina, dun-bar — throughout
- Cosmia pyralina, lunar-spotted pinion — south & central (localized)
- Hyppa rectilinea, Saxon — north (Nationally Scarce B)
- Apamea monoglypha, dark arches — throughout
- Apamea lithoxylaea, light arches — throughout
- Apamea sublustris, reddish light arches — south & central (localized)
- Apamea zeta

- Apamea zeta assimilis, northern arches — north (Nationally Scarce A)
- Apamea zeta marmorata, exile — Shetland

- Apamea oblonga, crescent striped — south & central (Nationally Scarce B)
- Apamea crenata, clouded-bordered brindle — throughout
- Apamea epomidion, clouded brindle — south, central & north
- Apamea lateritia, scarce brindle — immigrant
- Apamea furva britannica, confused — north, west & south (localized)
- Apamea remissa, dusky brocade — throughout ‡*
- Apamea unanimis, small clouded brindle — south, central & north
- Apamea anceps, large nutmeg — south & central (localized) ‡*
- Apamea sordens, rustic shoulder-knot — throughout
- Apamea scolopacina, slender brindle — south & central
- Apamea ophiogramma, double lobed — throughout
- Eremobina pabulatricula, union rustic — extinct
- Oligia strigilis, marbled minor — throughout
- Oligia versicolor, rufous minor — south, central & north (localized)
- Oligia latruncula, tawny marbled minor — south, central & north
- Oligia fasciuncula, middle-barred minor — throughout
- Mesoligia furuncula, cloaked minor — throughout
- Mesoligia literosa, rosy minor — throughout ‡*
- Mesapamea secalis, common rustic — throughout
- Mesapamea didyma, lesser common rustic — throughout
- Mesapamea remmi, Remm's rustic — south & central (?north) — status as a valid species uncertain
- Photedes captiuncula expolita, least minor — central (Red Data Book)
- Photedes minima, small dotted buff — throughout
- Chortodes morrisii

- Chortodes morrisii morrisii, Morris's wainscot — south-west (Red Data Book)
- Chortodes morrisii bondii, Bond's wainscot — south-east (Red Data Book; probably extinct)

- Chortodes extrema, concolorous — south-east & east-central (Red Data Book) ‡
- Chortodes elymi, lyme grass — east (Nationally Scarce B)
- Chortodes fluxa, mere wainscot — east-central & south (Nationally Scarce B)
- Chortodes pygmina, small wainscot — throughout
- Chortodes brevilinea, Fenn's wainscot — east (Red Data Book) ‡
- Eremobia ochroleuca, dusky sallow — south & east-central
- Luperina testacea, flounced rustic — throughout
- Luperina nickerlii, sandhill rustic ‡

- Luperina nickerlii demuthi — south-east (Nationally Scarce A)
- Luperina nickerlii leechi — south-west (Red Data Book)
- Luperina nickerlii gueneei — west-central (Red Data Book)

- Luperina dumerilii, Dumeril's rustic — immigrant
- Luperina zollikoferi, scarce arches — immigrant
- Amphipoea lucens, large ear — south-west, west-central & north (localized)
- Amphipoea fucosa paludis, saltern ear — south, central & north-west (localized)
- Amphipoea crinanensis, crinan ear — west, central & north (localized)
- Amphipoea oculea, ear moth — throughout ‡*
- Hydraecia micacea, rosy rustic — throughout ‡*
- Hydraecia petasitis, butterbur — south, central & north (localized)
- Hydraecia osseola hucherardi, marsh mallow moth — south-east (Red Data Book)
- Gortyna flavago, frosted orange — throughout
- Gortyna borelii lunata, Fisher's estuarine moth — south-east (Red Data Book)
- Celaena haworthii, Haworth's minor — central, north & south (localized) †*
- Celaena leucostigma, crescent ‡*

- Celaena leucostigma leucostigma — throughout (localized)
- Celaena leucostigma scotica — north (localized)

- Nonagria typhae, bulrush wainscot — throughout
- Archanara geminipuncta, twin-spotted wainscot — south & east-central (localized)
- Archanara dissoluta, brown-veined wainscot — south & central (localized)
- Archanara neurica, white-mantled wainscot — south-east (Red Data Book) ‡
- Archanara sparganii, Webb's wainscot — south, south-east & south-west (Nationally Scarce B)
- Archanara algae, rush wainscot — south-east & east-central (Red Data Book)
- Rhizedra lutosa, large wainscot — throughout ‡*
- Sedina buettneri, Blair's wainscot — south (Red Data Book)
- Arenostola phragmitidis, fen wainscot — south, east-central & west-central (localized)
- Oria musculosa, Brighton wainscot — south (proposed Red Data Book)
- Coenobia rufa, small rufous — south, central & north (localized)
- Charanyca trigrammica, treble lines — south & central
- Hoplodrina alsines, uncertain — throughout
- Hoplodrina blanda, rustic — throughout ‡*
- Hoplodrina superstes, powdered rustic — rare immigrant
- Hoplodrina ambigua, Vine's rustic — south & central
- Spodoptera exigua, small mottled willow — immigrant
- Spodoptera littoralis, Mediterranean brocade — probable rare immigrant & import
- [Spodoptera litura, Asian cotton leafworm — probable import]
- [Spodoptera eridania, southern armworm — probable import]
- Spodoptera cilium, dark mottled willow — rare immigrant
- Caradrina morpheus, mottled rustic — throughout ‡*
- Platyperigea kadenii, Clancy's rustic — rare immigrant
- Paradrina flavirena, Lorimer's rustic — probable rare immigrant
- Paradrina clavipalpis, pale mottled willow — throughout
- Perigea capensis, African — probable rare immigrant
- Chilodes maritimus, silky wainscot — south & central (localized)
- Athetis pallustris, marsh moth — east-central (Red Data Book)
- Proxenus hospes, Porter's rustic — rare immigrant
- Acosmetia caliginosa, reddish buff — south (Red Data Book)
- Stilbia anomala, anomalous — south, south-west, west & north (localized) ‡*
- Elaphria venustula, rosy marbled — south-east (Nationally Scarce B)

== Subfamily Stiriinae ==
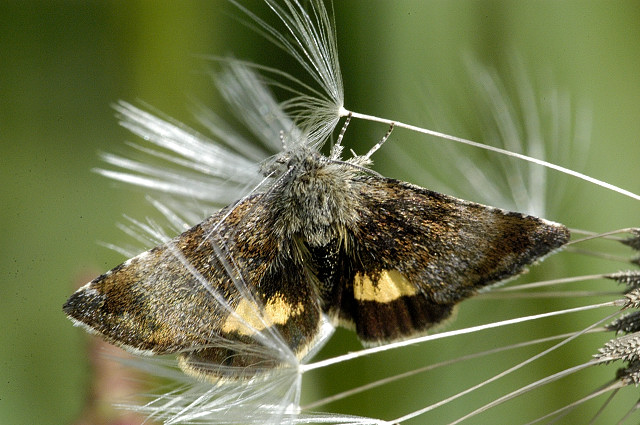
Small yellow underwing

- Synthymia fixa, goldwing — rare immigrant
- Panemeria tenebrata, small yellow underwing — south & central (localized)

== Subfamily Heliothinae ==
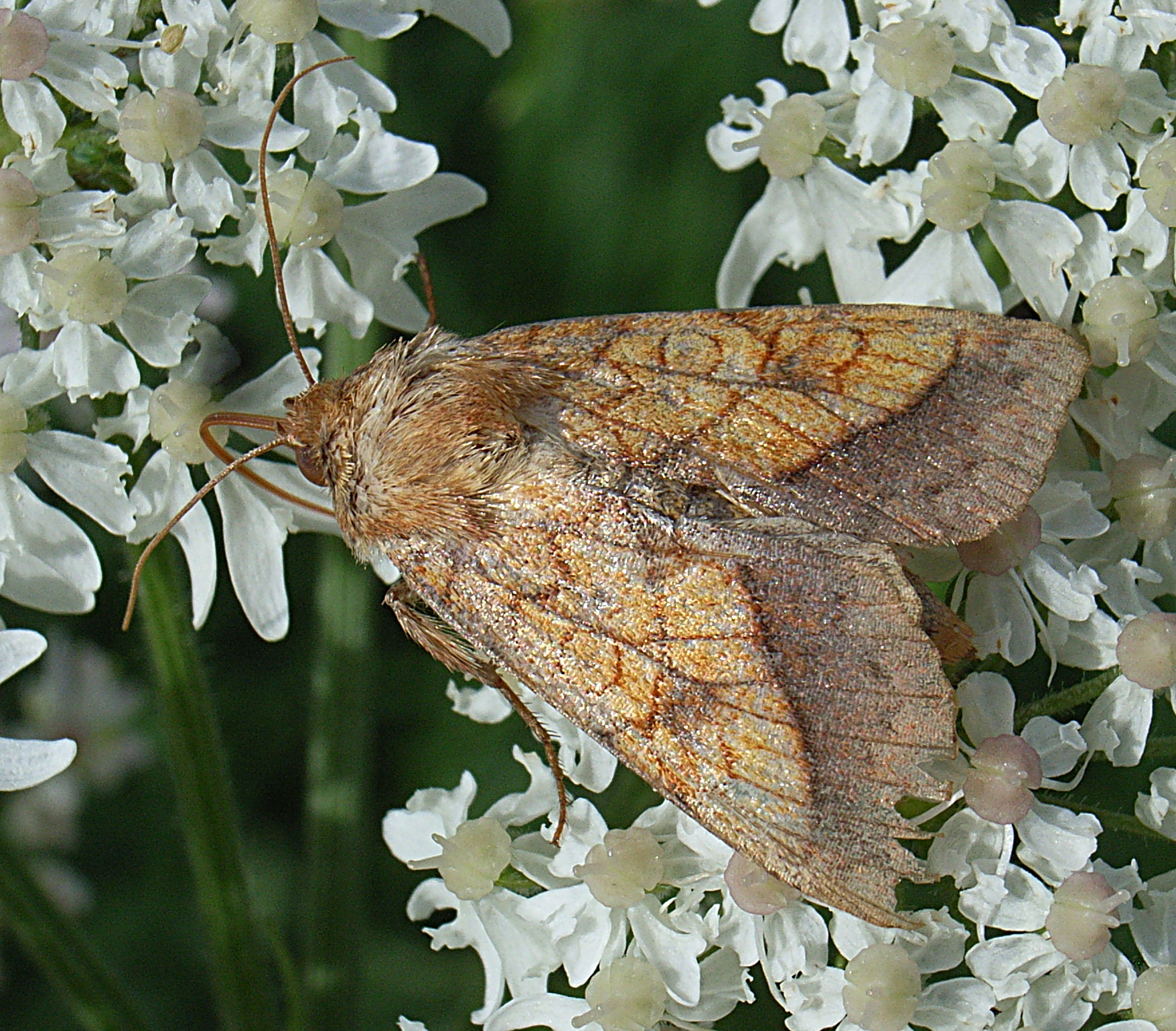
Bordered sallow

- Periphanes delphinii, pease blossom — possible immigrant & import
- Pyrrhia umbra, bordered sallow — south, central & north-east (localized)
- Helicoverpa armigera, scarce bordered straw — immigrant
- Heliothis viriplaca, marbled clover — probable immigrant to south & east-central (Red Data Book)
- Heliothis maritima, shoulder-striped clover ‡

- Heliothis maritima warneckei — south (Red Data Book)
- Heliothis maritima bulgarica — rare immigrant

- Heliothis peltigera, bordered straw — immigrant
- Heliothis nubigera, eastern bordered straw — rare immigrant
- Schinia scutosa, spotted clover — immigrant

== Subfamily Eustrotiinae ==
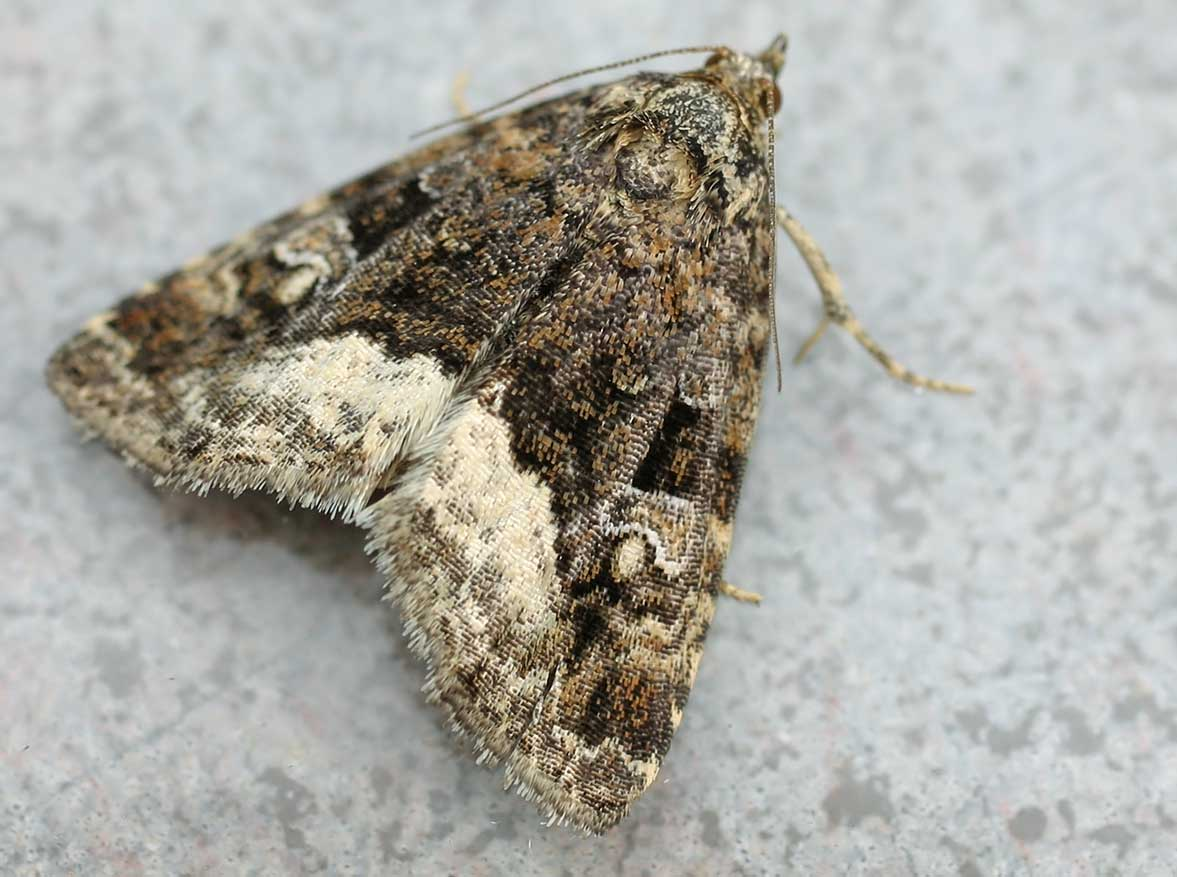
Marbled white spot

- Eublemma ostrina, purple marbled — immigrant
- Eublemma parva, small marbled — immigrant
- Eublemma minutata, scarce marbled — probable rare immigrant
- Protodeltote pygarga, marbled white spot — south & central
- Deltote deceptoria, pretty marbled — immigrant & transitory resident
- Deltote uncula, silver hook — south, central & north-west (localized)
- Deltote bankiana, silver barred — probable immigrant to south-east (Red Data Book)

== Subfamily Acontiinae ==
- Emmelia trabealis, spotted sulphur — presumed extinct
- Acontia lucida, pale shoulder — immigrant
- [Acontia aprica, nun — probable import]
- [Acontia nitidula, Brixton beauty — one dubious record]

== Subfamily Eariadinae ==
- Earias clorana, cream-bordered green pea — south & east-central (Nationally Scarce B)
- Earias biplaga, spiny bollworm — rare immigrant or import
- Earias insulana, Egyptian bollworm — probable rare immigrant & import
- [Earias vittella — imported by air on food produce]

== Subfamily Chloephorinae ==
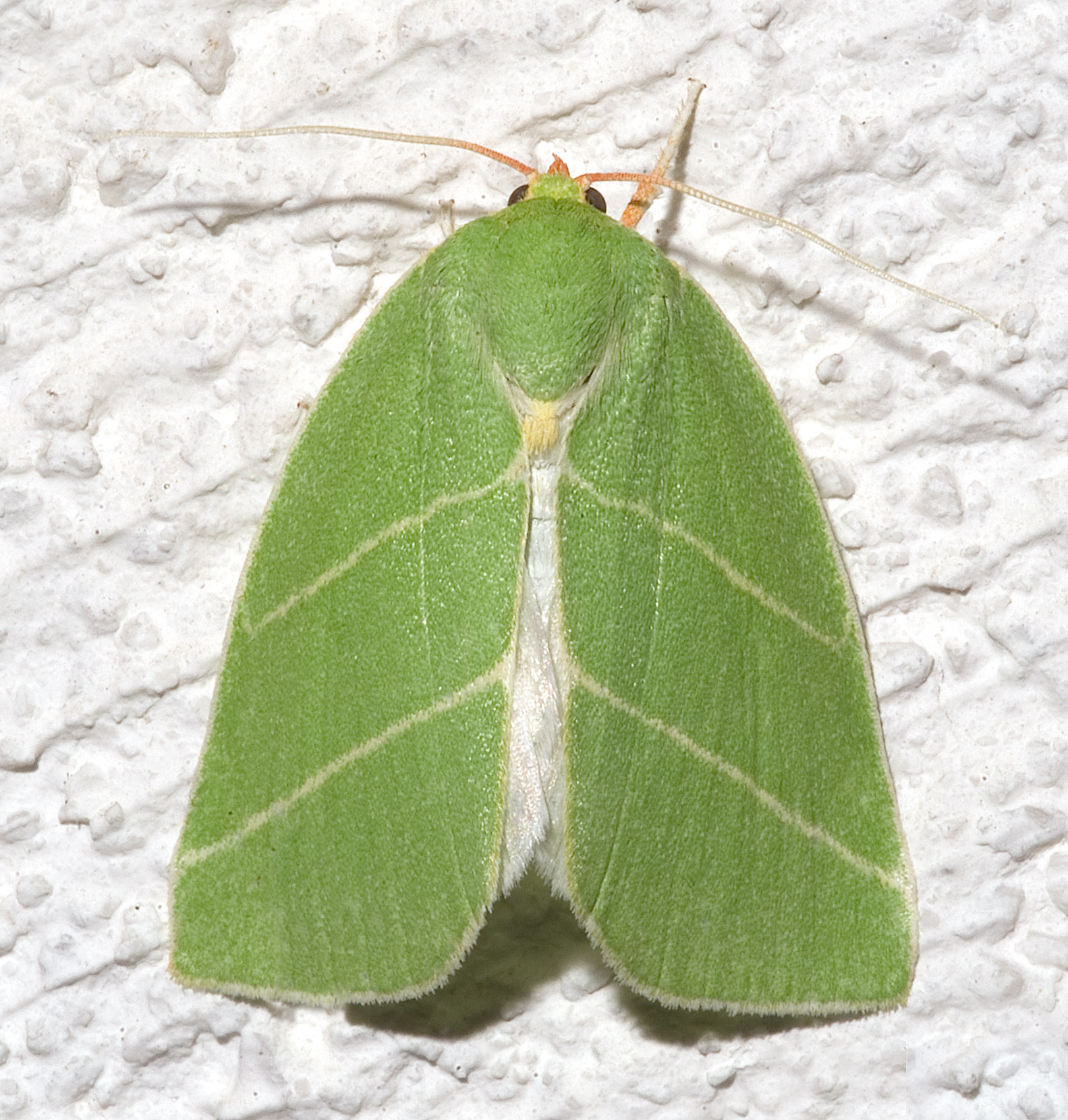
Scarce silver-lines

- Bena bicolorana, scarce silver-lines — south & central (localized)
- Pseudoips prasinana britannica, green silver-lines — throughout
- Nycteola revayana, oak nycteoline — throughout (localized)
- Nycteola asiatica, eastern nycteoline — probable rare immigrant
- Nycteola degenerana, sallow nycteoline — possible rare immigrant (otherwise import)
- [Pardasena virgulana, grey square — probable import (one record)]

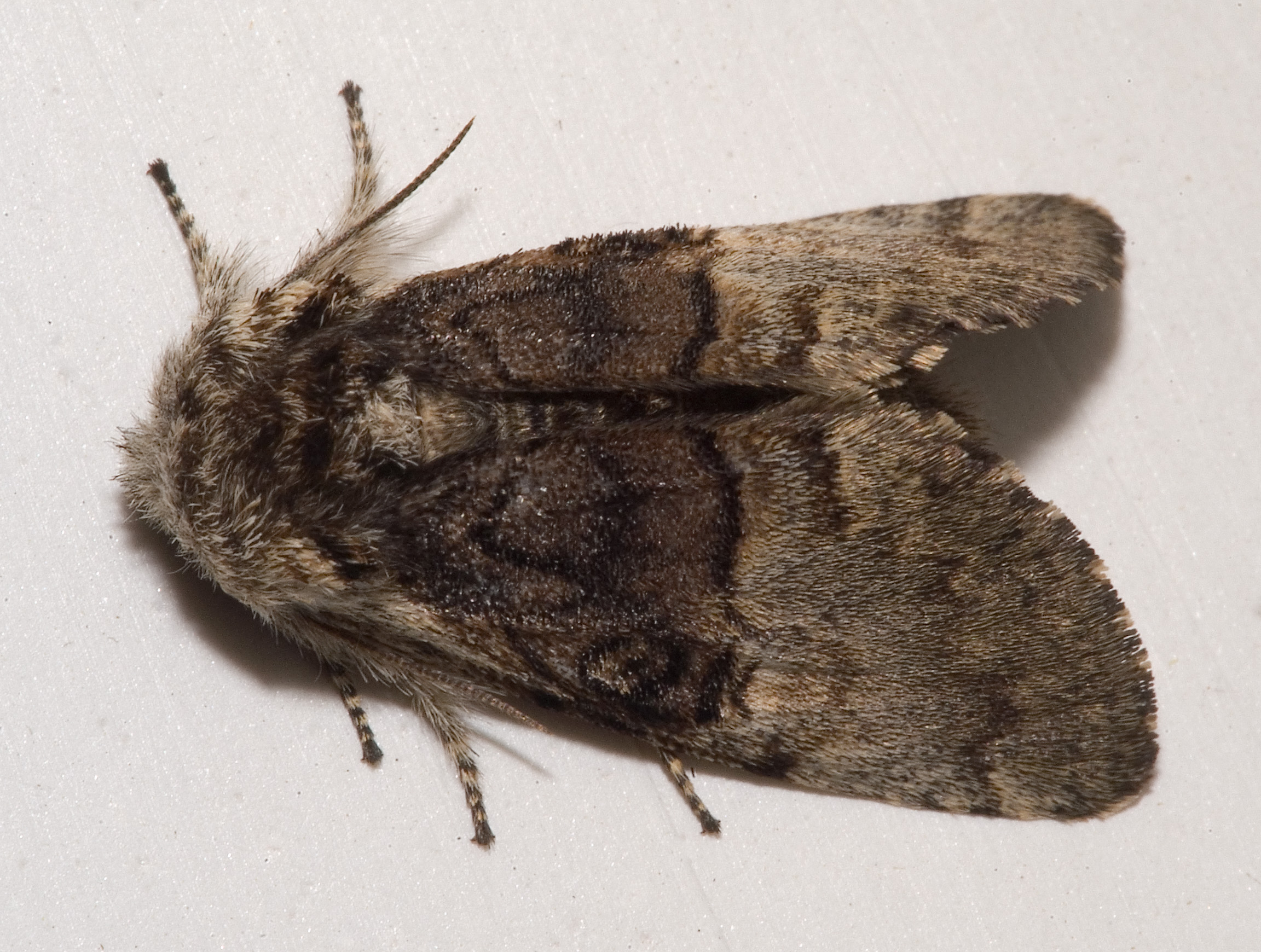
Nut-tree tussock

== Subfamily Pantheinae ==
- Colocasia coryli, nut-tree tussock — throughout
- [Charadra deridens, marbled tuffet — probable import]
- [Raphia frater, brother — probable import]

== Subfamily Plusiinae ==
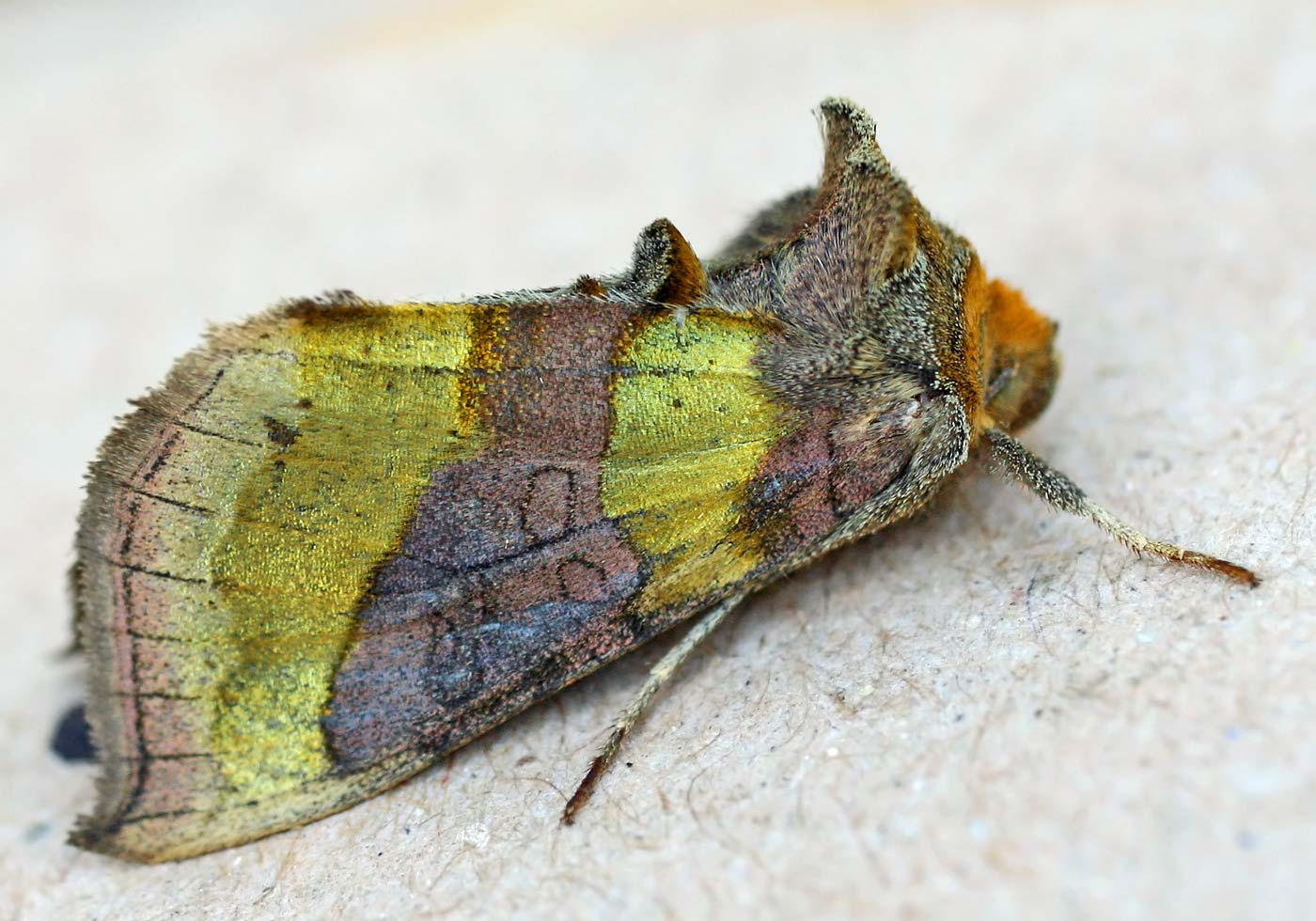
Burnished brass

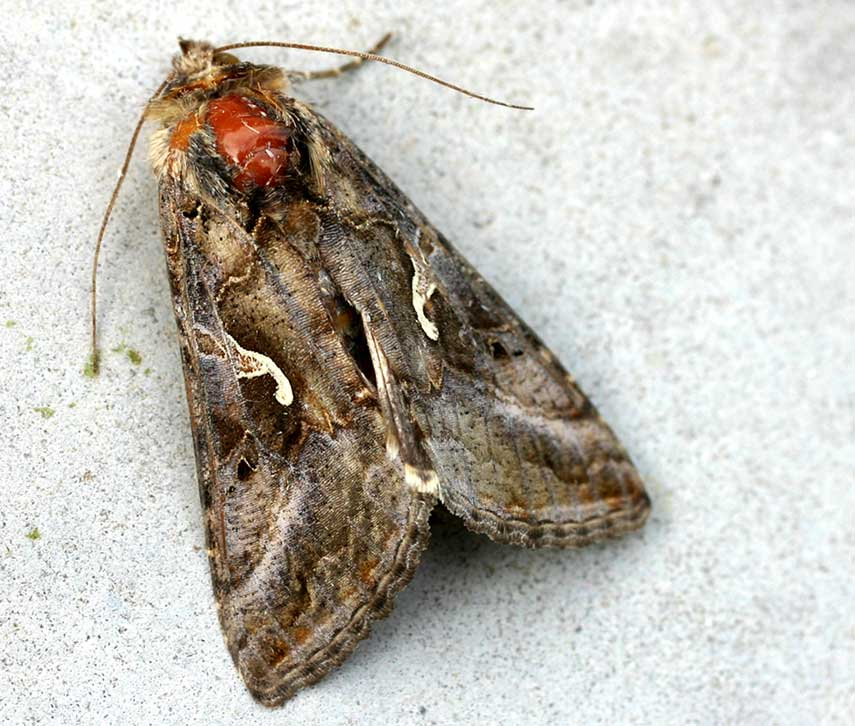
Silver Y

- Chrysodeixis chalcites, golden twin-spot — immigrant & import
- Chrysodeixis acuta, Tunbridge Wells gem — rare immigrant
- Ctenoplusia limbirena, scar bank gem — immigrant
- Ctenoplusia accentifera, accent gem — probable rare immigrant
- Trichoplusia ni, ni moth — immigrant
- Trichoplusia vittata, streaked plusia — probable rare immigrant
- Thysanoplusia orichalcea, slender burnished brass — immigrant & import
- Diachrysia chrysitis, burnished brass — throughout
- Diachrysia chryson, scarce burnished brass — south & west-central (Nationally Scarce A)
- [Pseudoplusia includens, soybean looper — probable import]
- Macdunnoughia confusa, Dewick's plusia — immigrant
- Polychrysia moneta, golden plusia — south, central & north
- [Euchalcia variabilis, purple-shaded gem — probable import]
- Plusia festucae, gold spot — throughout
- Plusia putnami gracilis, Lempke's gold spot — central, north & south (localized)

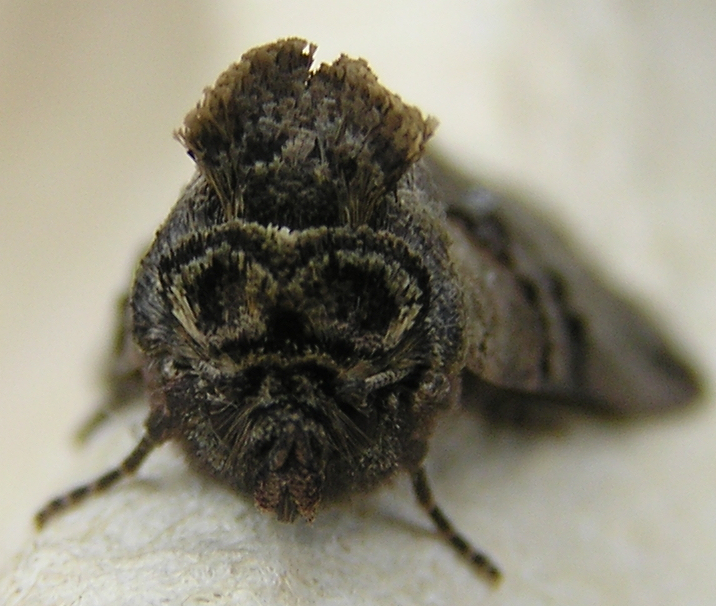
Spectacle (head-on)

- Autographa gamma, silver Y — immigrant throughout
- Autographa pulchrina, beautiful golden Y — throughout
- Autographa jota, plain golden Y — throughout
- Autographa bractea, gold spangle — west, north & south
- Megalographa biloba, Stephens' gem — probable rare immigrant
- [Megalographa bimaculata, double-spotted spangle — single specimen of uncertain origin]
- Syngrapha interrogationis, scarce silver Y — central & north (localized)
- Cornutiplusia circumflexa, Essex Y — probable rare immigrant
- Abrostola triplasia, dark spectacle — throughout
- Abrostola tripartita, spectacle — throughout

== Subfamily Catocalinae ==
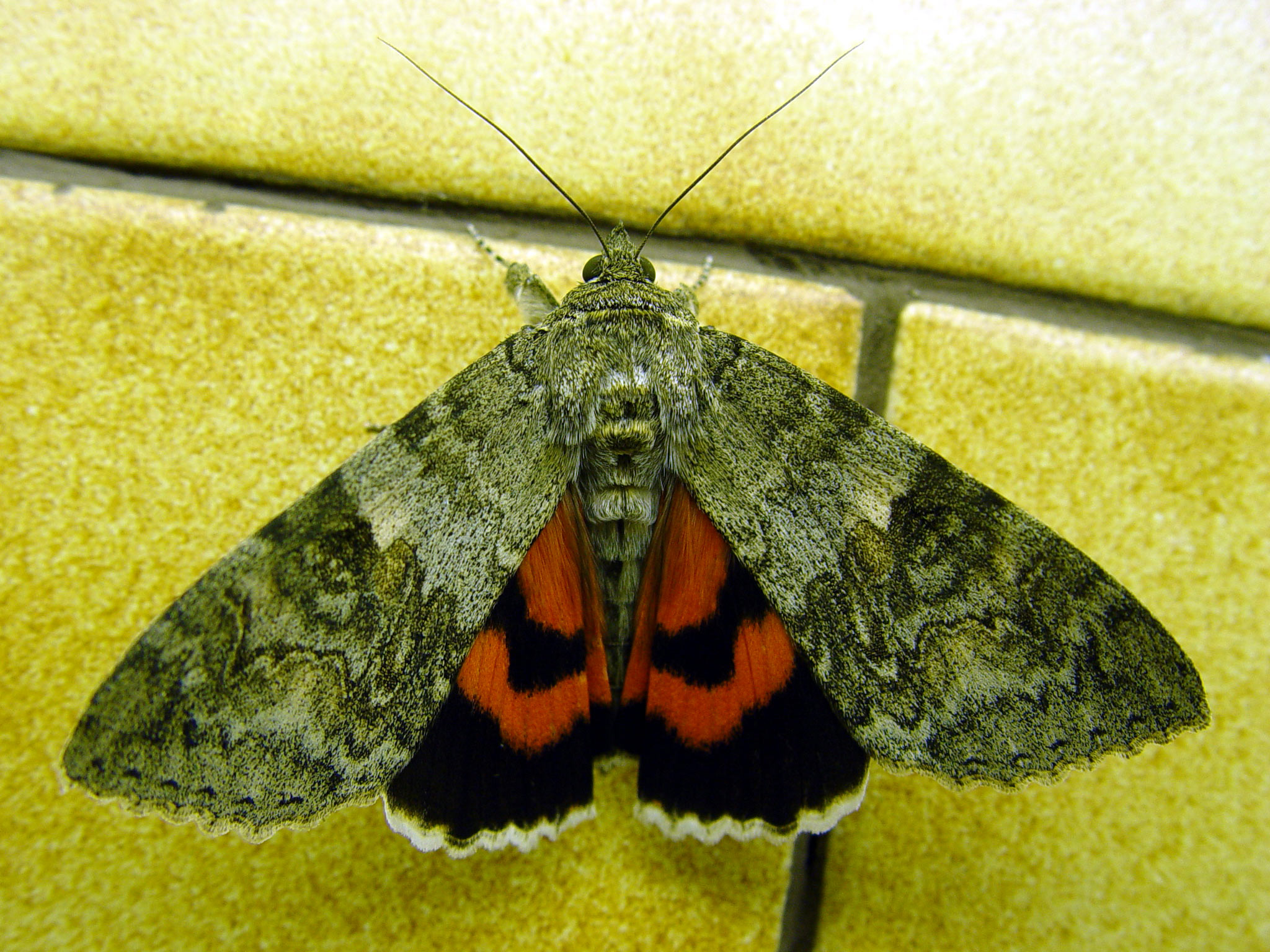
Red underwing

- Catocala fraxini, Clifden nonpareil — immigrant & transitory resident
- Catocala nupta, red underwing — south & central
- Catocala electa, rosy underwing — rare immigrant
- Catocala promissa, light crimson underwing — south (Red Data Book)
- Catocala sponsa, dark crimson underwing — south (Red Data Book)
- Catocala nymphagoga, oak yellow underwing — probable rare immigrant
- Minucia lunaris, lunar double-stripe — immigrant & transitory resident
- Clytie illunaris, Trent double-stripe — possible rare immigrant (otherwise import)
- [Caenurgina crassiuscula, double-barred — probable import]
- [Mocis trifasciata, triple-barred — one specimen of dubious origin]
- Dysgonia algira, passenger — immigrant
- Prodotis stolida, geometrician — rare immigrant
- Callistege mi, Mother Shipton — south, central & north
- Euclidia glyphica, burnet companion — south & central

== Subfamily Ophiderinae ==
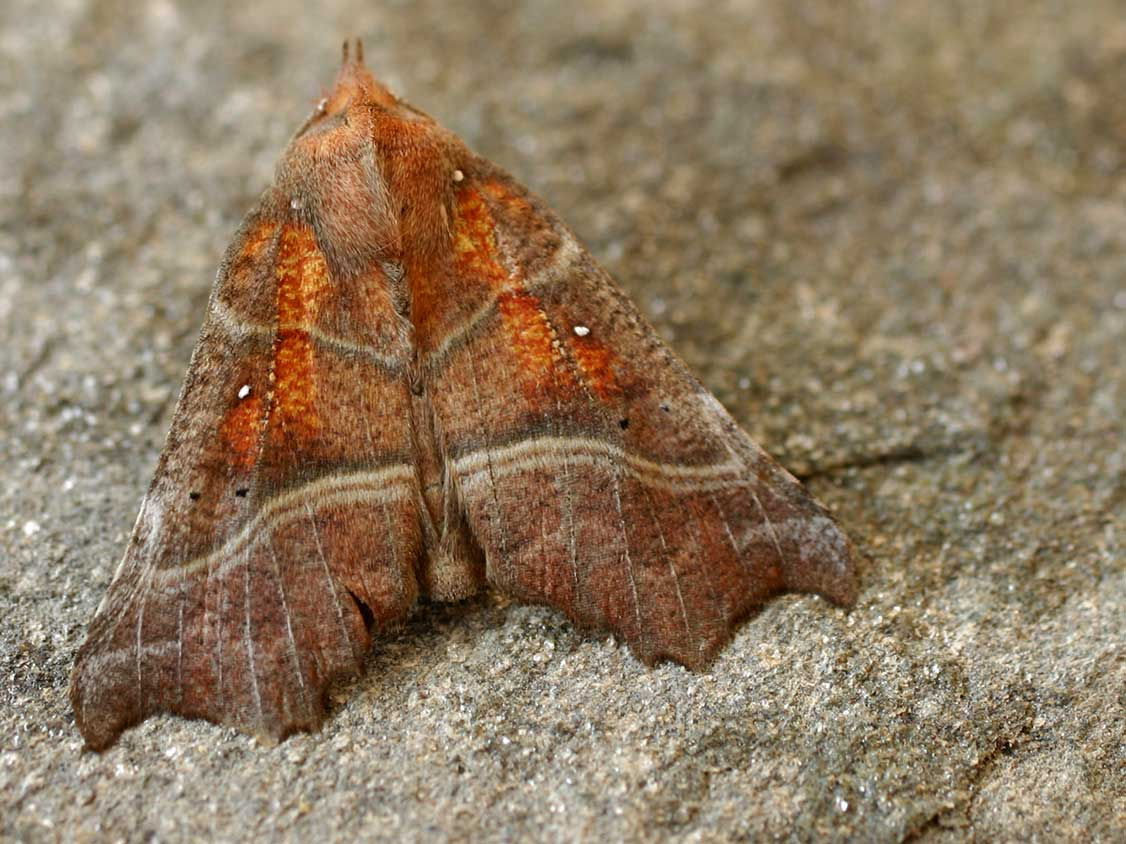
Herald

- Catephia alchymista, alchymist — immigrant
- Tyta luctuosa, four-spotted — south, central & east (Nationally Scarce A)
- [Diphthera festiva — probable import]
- Lygephila pastinum, blackneck — south & central (localized)
- Lygephila craccae, scarce blackneck — south-west (Red Data Book)
- Tathorhynchus exsiccata, Levant blackneck — rare immigrant
- [Synedoida grandirena, great kidney — probable import]
- Scoliopteryx libatrix, herald — throughout
- Phytometra viridaria, small purple-barred — throughout (localized)
- Anomis sabulifera, angled gem — possible rare immigrant (otherwise import)

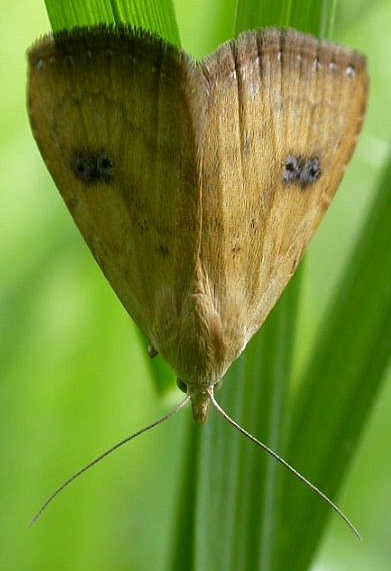
Straw dot

== Subfamily Rivulinae ==
- Colobochyla salicalis, lesser belle — rare immigrant (formerly resident)
- Laspeyria flexula, beautiful hook-tip — south & west-central (localized)
- Rivula sericealis, straw dot — throughout
- Parascotia fuliginaria, waved black — probable immigrant
- [Orodesma apicina — probable import]

== Subfamily Hypeninae ==
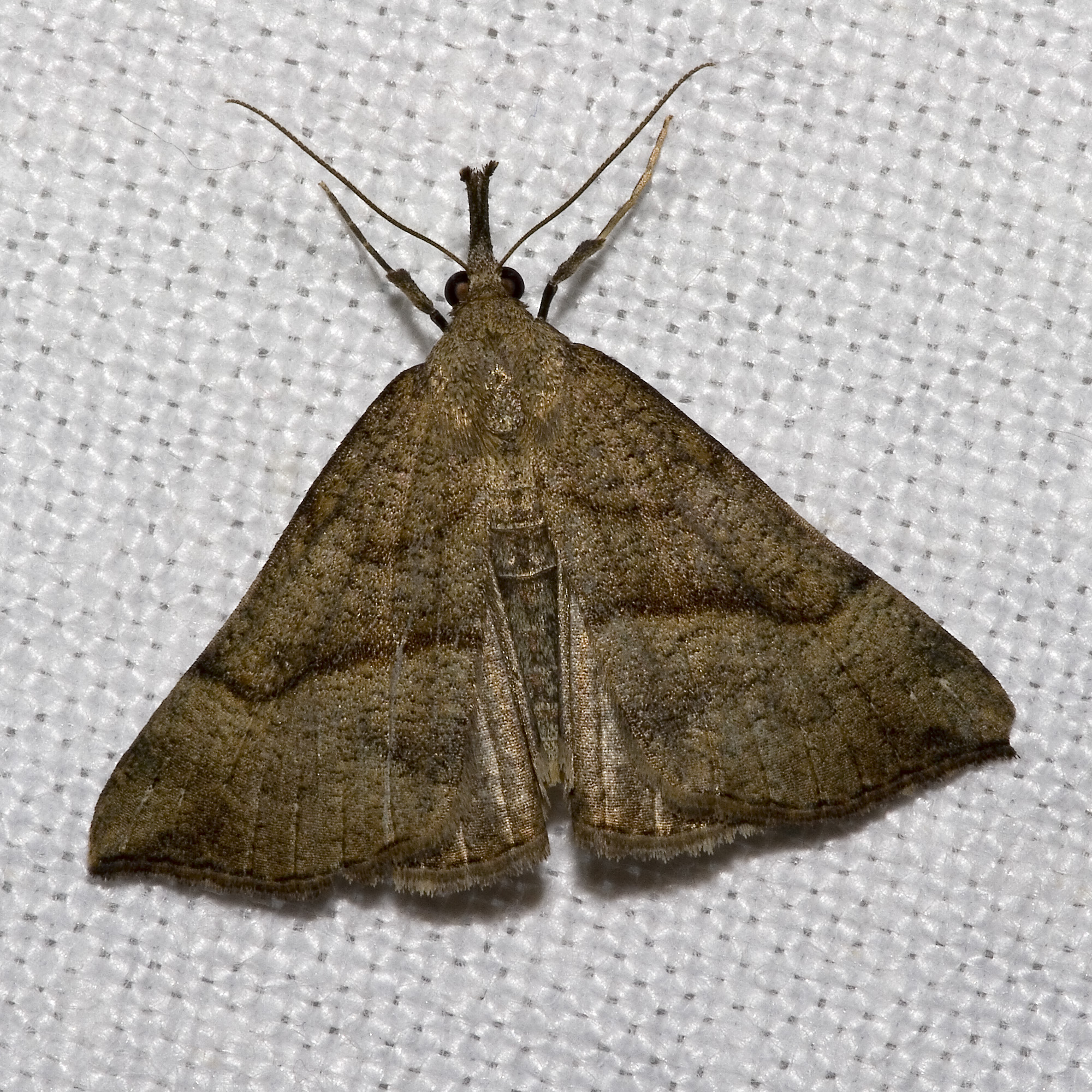
Snout

- Hypena crassalis, beautiful snout — south & west-central (localized)
- Hypena proboscidalis, snout — throughout
- Hypena obsitalis, Bloxworth snout — south-west (Red Data Book)
- Hypena obesalis, Paignton snout — rare immigrant
- Hypena rostralis, buttoned snout — south (Nationally Scarce B)
- [Plathypena scabra, black snout — probable import]

== Subfamily Strepsimananiae ==
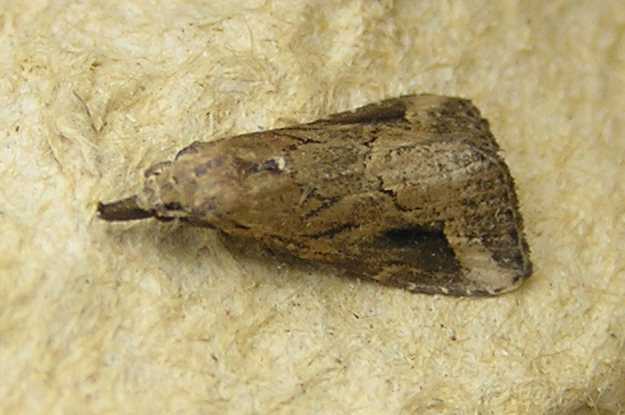
Pinion-streaked snout

- Schrankia taenialis, white-line snout — south (Nationally Scarce B)
- Schrankia intermedialis, autumnal snout — south-east — probable hybrid
- Schrankia costaestrigalis, pinion-streaked snout — south, central & north-west (localized)
- Hypenodes humidalis, marsh oblique-barred — throughout (Nationally Scarce B)
- [Idia aemula, waved tabby — two specimens of unknown origin]
- [Idia lubricalis, twin-striped tabby — two specimens of unknown origin]

== Subfamily Herminiinae ==
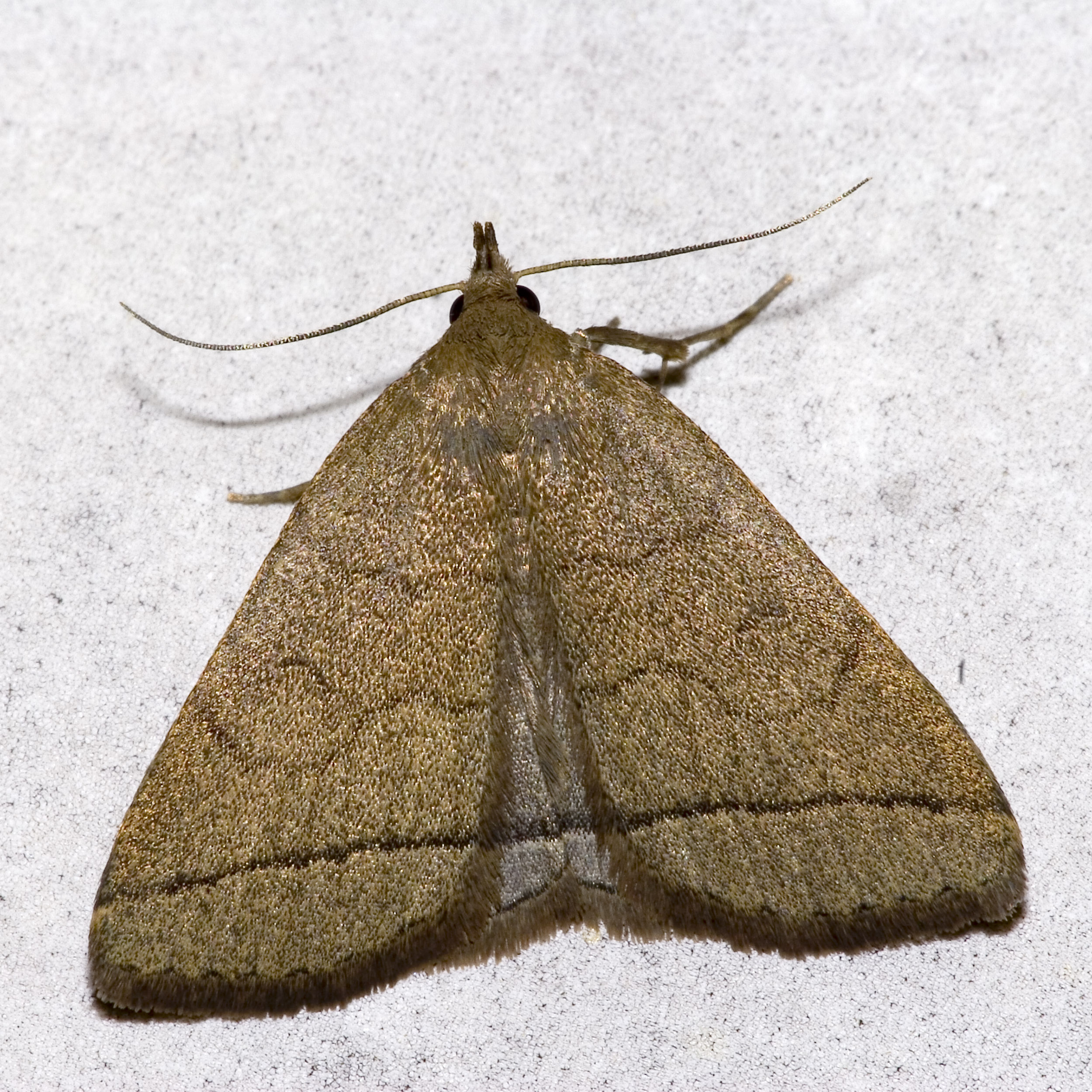
Fan-foot

- Pechipogo strigilata, common fan-foot — south (Nationally Scarce A)
- Pechipogo plumigeralis, plumed fan-foot — rare immigrant
- Zanclognatha tarsipennalis, fan-foot — throughout
- Zanclognatha lunalis, jubilee fan-foot — rare immigrant
- Herminia tarsicrinalis, shaded fan-foot — south-east (Red Data Book)
- Zanclognatha zelleralis, dusky fan-foot — possible very rare immigrant
- Herminia grisealis, small fan-foot — throughout
- Macrochilo cribrumalis, dotted fan-foot — south-east (Nationally Scarce B)
- Paracolax tristalis, clay fan-foot — immigrant to south-east (Nationally Scarce A)
- Trisateles emortualis, olive crescent — south-east (Red Data Book)

Species listed in the 2007 UK Biodiversity Action Plan (BAP) are indicated by a double-dagger symbol (‡)—species so listed for research purposes only are also indicated with an asterisk (‡*).

== See also ==
- List of moths of Great Britain (overview)
  - Family lists: Hepialidae, Cossidae, Zygaenidae, Limacodidae, Sesiidae, Lasiocampidae, Saturniidae, Endromidae, Drepanidae, Thyatiridae, Geometridae, Sphingidae, Notodontidae, Thaumetopoeidae, Lymantriidae, Arctiidae, Ctenuchidae, Nolidae, Noctuidae and Micromoths
