= List of moths of Great Britain (Geometridae) =

The family Geometridae is represented by over 300 species in Great Britain.

== Subfamily Archiearinae ==
- Archiearis parthenias, orange underwing — throughout (localized)
- Archiearis notha, light orange underwing —south (Nationally Scarce B)

== Subfamily Alsophilinae ==
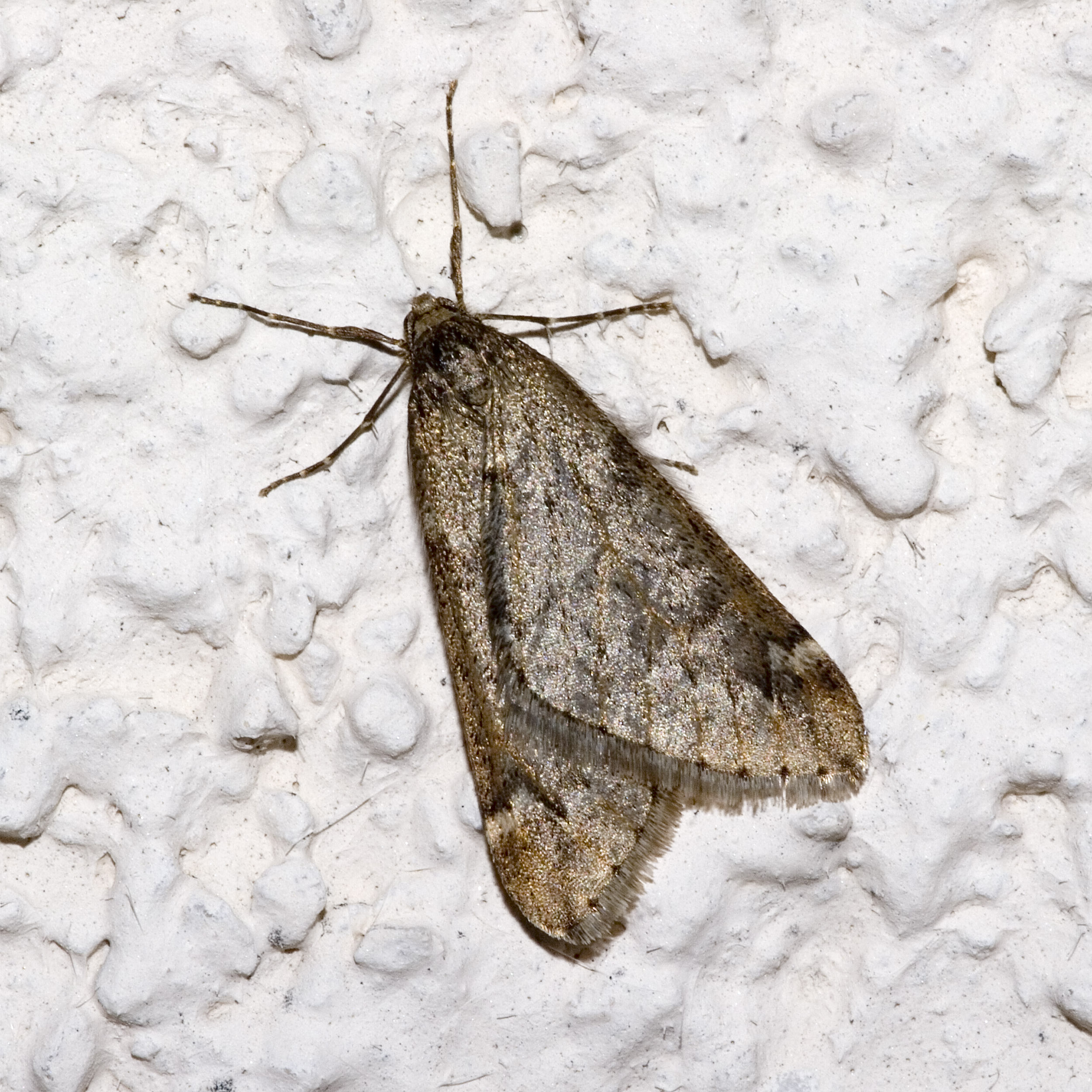
March moth

- Alsophila aescularia, March moth — throughout

== Subfamily Geometrinae ==
- Aplasta ononaria, rest harrow — south-east (Red Data Book) ‡
- Pseudoterpna coronillaria, Jersey emerald — Jersey
- Pseudoterpna pruinata atropunctaria, grass emerald — throughout
- Geometra papilionaria, large emerald — throughout
- Comibaena bajularia, blotched emerald — south & centre (localized)
- Antonechloris smaragdaria maritima, Essex emerald — south-east, presumed extinct
- Hemithea aestivaria, common emerald — south & central
- Chlorissa viridata, small grass emerald — south & west-central (Nationally Scarce A)
- [Chlorochlamys chloroleucaria, blackberry looper — probable import]
- Thalera fimbrialis, Sussex emerald — south-east (Red Data Book) ‡
- Hemistola chrysoprasaria, small emerald — south & central (localized) (Vulnerable) ‡*
- Jodis lactearia, little emerald — south, central & north-west (localized)

== Subfamily Sterrhinae ==
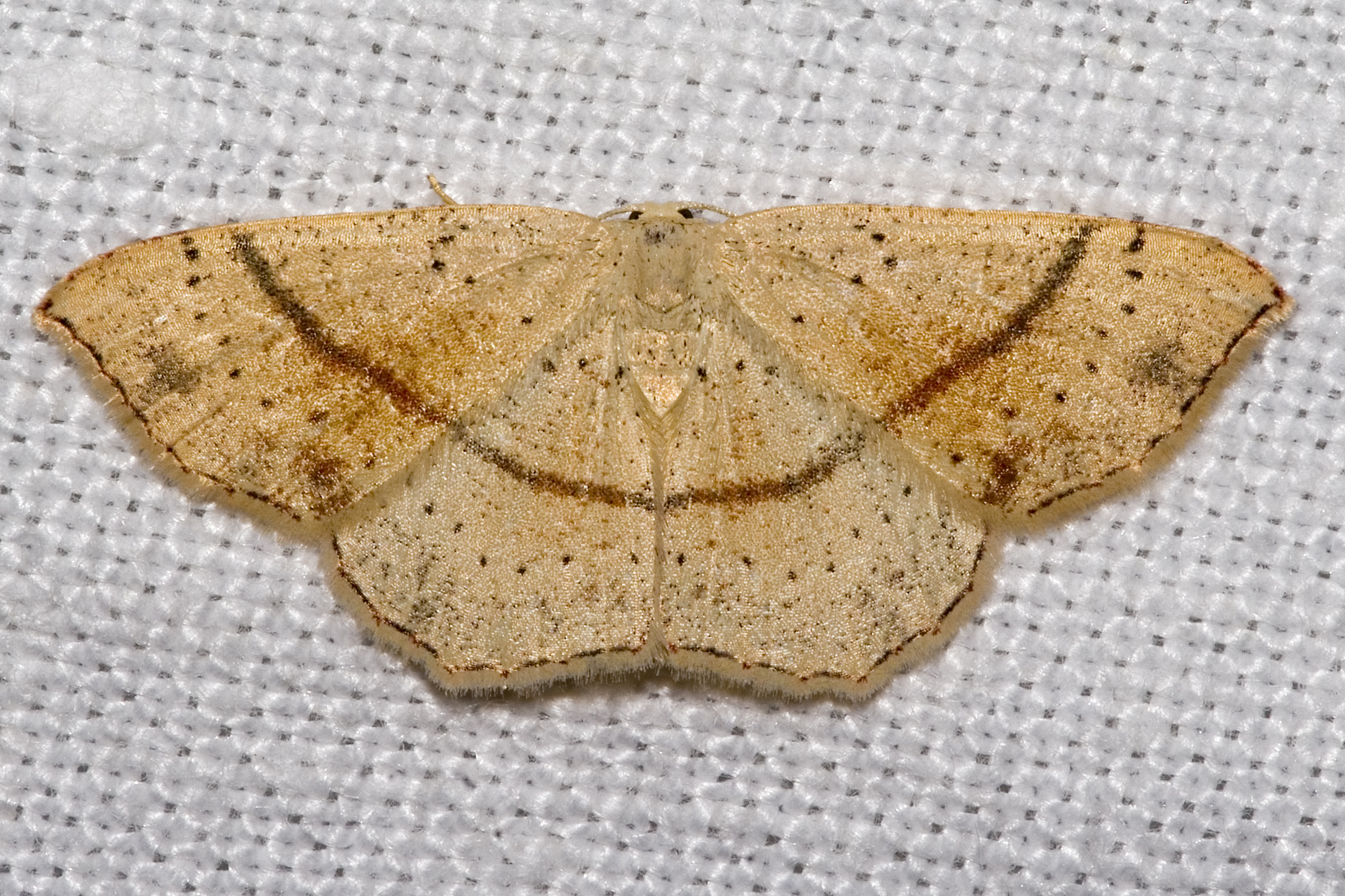
Maiden's blush

- Cyclophora pendularia, dingy mocha — south (Red Data Book) ‡
- Cyclophora annularia, mocha — south (Nationally Scarce B)
- Cyclophora albipunctata, birch mocha — throughout
- Cyclophora puppillaria, Blair's mocha — immigrant
- Cyclophora porata, false mocha — south & central (Nationally Scarce B) ‡
- Cyclophora punctaria, maiden's blush — south & central (localized)
- Cyclophora linearia, clay triple-lines —south & central (localized)
- Timandra comae, blood-vein — south & central; localized in north (Vulnerable) ‡*
- Scopula immorata, Lewes wave — probably extinct
- Scopula nigropunctata, sub-angled wave — south-east (Red Data Book)

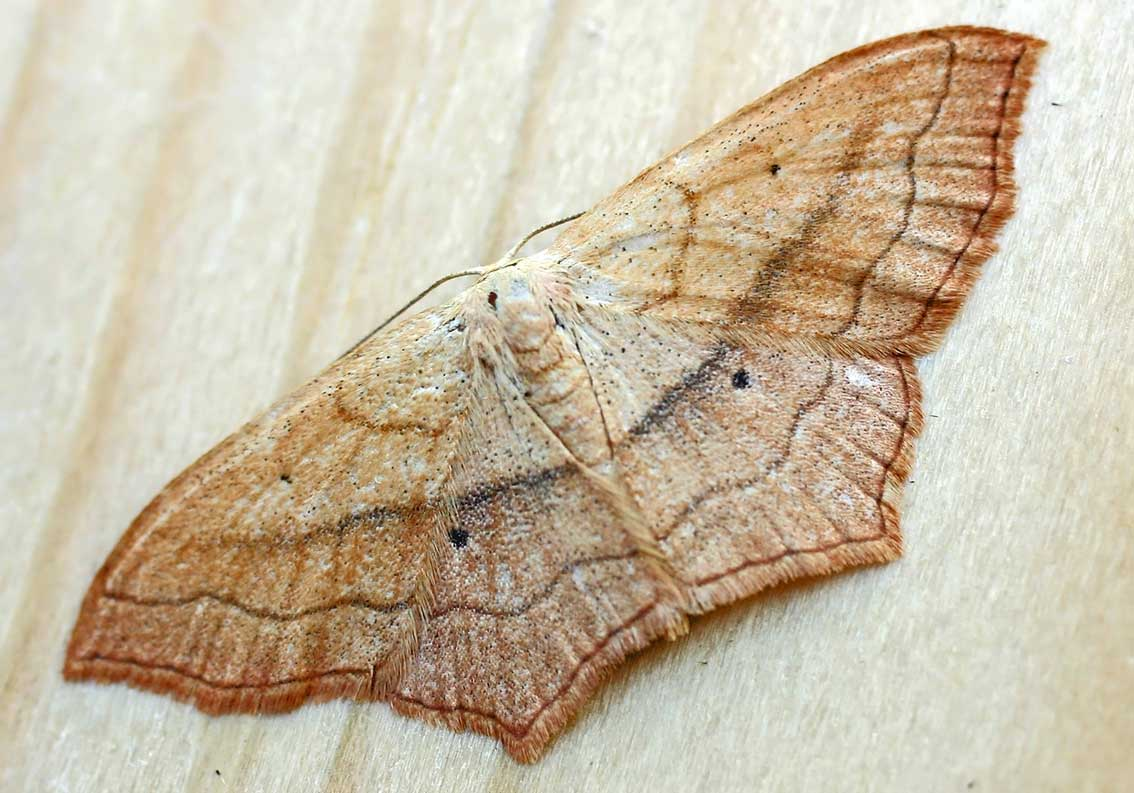
Small blood-vein

- [Scopula virgulata, streaked wave — old, unconfirmed record]
- [Scopula decorata, middle lace border — unverified records]
- Scopula ornata, lace border — south (Nationally Scarce B)
- Scopula rubiginata, tawny wave — south-east (Red Data Book)
- Scopula marginepunctata, mullein wave — south, central & north (localized) (Vulnerable) ‡*
- Scopula imitaria, small blood-vein — south & central
- Scopula emutaria, rosy wave — south, east & west (Nationally Scarce B)
- Scopula immutata, lesser cream wave — south & central (localized)
- Scopula floslactata, cream wave

- Scopula floslactata floslactata — south & central (localized)
- Scopula floslactata f. scotica — north-west (localized)

- Scopula ternata, smoky wave — north & west (localized)
- [Scopula limboundata, large lace border — single, old, unconfirmed record]

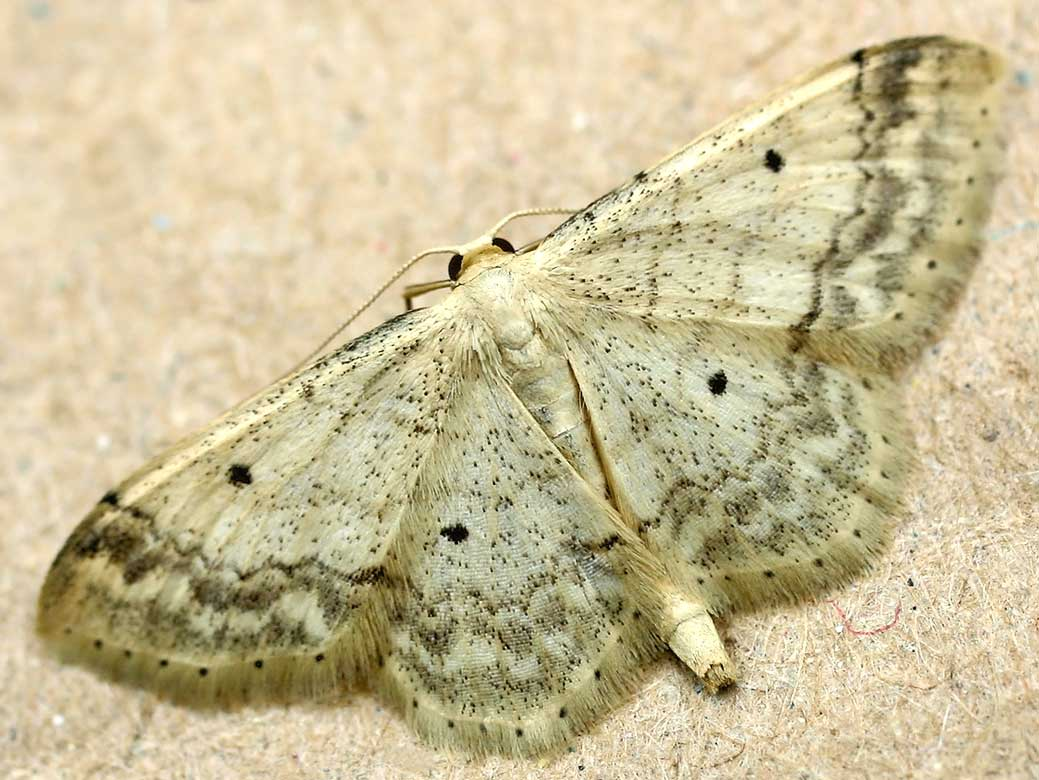
Small fan-foot wave

- Idaea ochrata cantiata, bright wave — south-east (Red Data Book) ‡
- Idaea serpentata, ochraceous wave — rare immigrant [resident on Jersey]
- Idaea muricata, purple-bordered gold — south & central (Nationally Scarce B)
- Idaea rusticata atrosignaria, least carpet — south (localized)
- [Idaea laevigata, strange wave — probable import]
- Idaea sylvestraria, dotted-border wave — south & central (Nationally Scarce B)
- Idaea biselata, small fan-footed wave — throughout
- [Idaea inquinata, rusty wave — probable import]
- Idaea dilutaria, silky wave — west (Red Data Book) ‡
- Idaea fuscovenosa, dwarf cream wave — south & central (localized)
- Idaea humiliata, Isle of Wight wave — presumed extinct

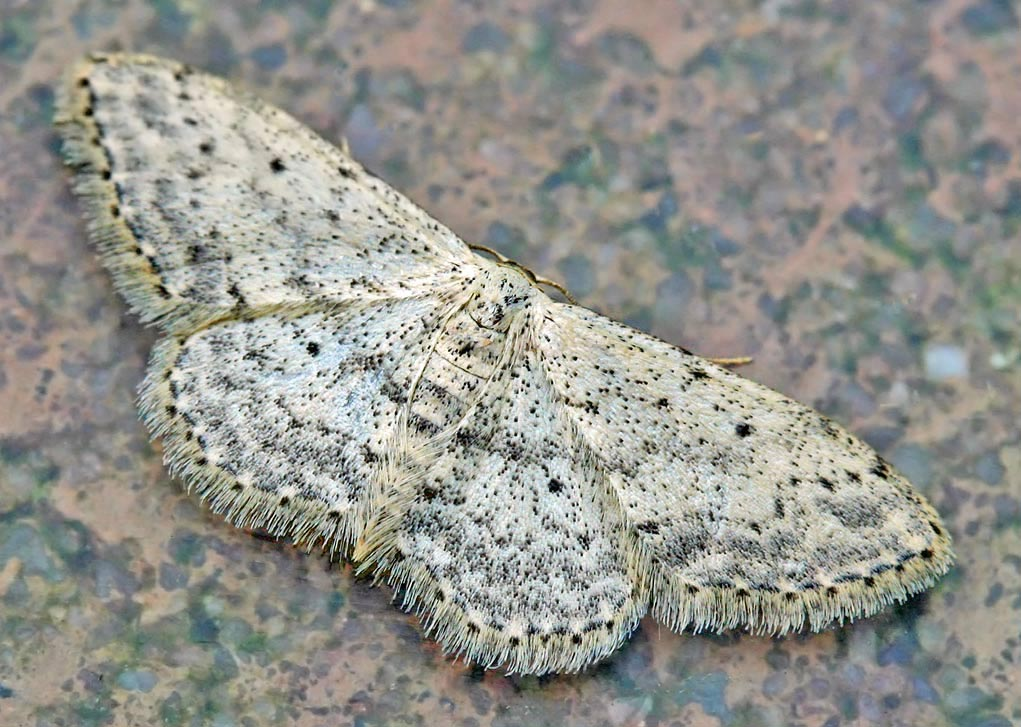
Small dusty wave

- Idaea seriata, small dusty wave — south, central & north-east
- Idaea dimidiata, single-dotted wave — south, central & north-west
- Idaea subsericeata, satin wave — south & central
- Idaea contiguaria britanniae, Weaver's wave — west-central (Nationally Scarce A)
- Idaea trigeminata, treble brown spot — south (localized)
- Idaea emarginata, small scallop — south & central (localized)
- Idaea aversata, riband wave — throughout
- Idaea degeneraria, Portland ribbon wave — south coast & Isles of Scilly (Red Data Book)
- Idaea straminata, plain wave — throughout
- Rhodometra sacraria, Vestal — immigrant

== Subfamily Larentiinae ==
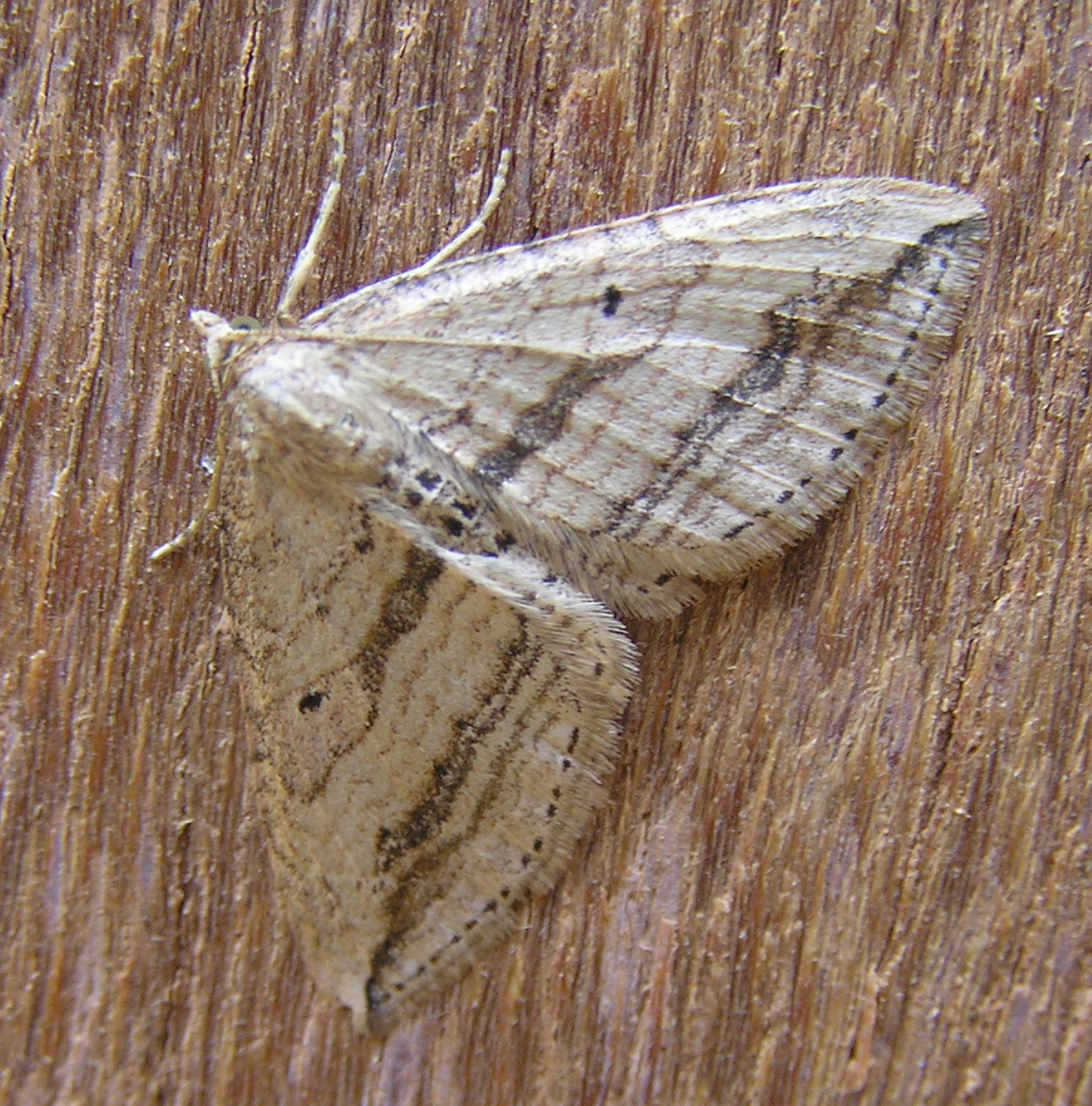
Oblique carpet

- [Lythria purpuraria, purple-barred yellow — old, unconfirmed records]
- Phibalapteryx virgata, oblique striped south & west-central (Nationally Scarce B)
- Orthonama vittata, oblique carpet — throughout ‡*
- Orthonama obstipata, gem — immigrant
- Xanthorhoe biriviata, balsam carpet — south & south-east (uncommon)
- Xanthorhoe designata, flame carpet — throughout
- Xanthorhoe decoloraria, red carpet ‡*

- Xanthorhoe decoloraria hethlandica — Shetland
- Xanthorhoe decoloraria decoloraria — north & west

- Xanthorhoe spadicearia, red twin-spot carpet — throughout
- Xanthorhoe ferrugata, dark-barred twin-spot carpet — throughout (Endangered) ‡*
- Xanthorhoe quadrifasiata, large twin-spot carpet — south & central (localized)
- Xanthorhoe montanata, silver-ground carpet

- Xanthorhoe montanata shetlandica — Shetland
- Xanthorhoe montanata montanata — throughout

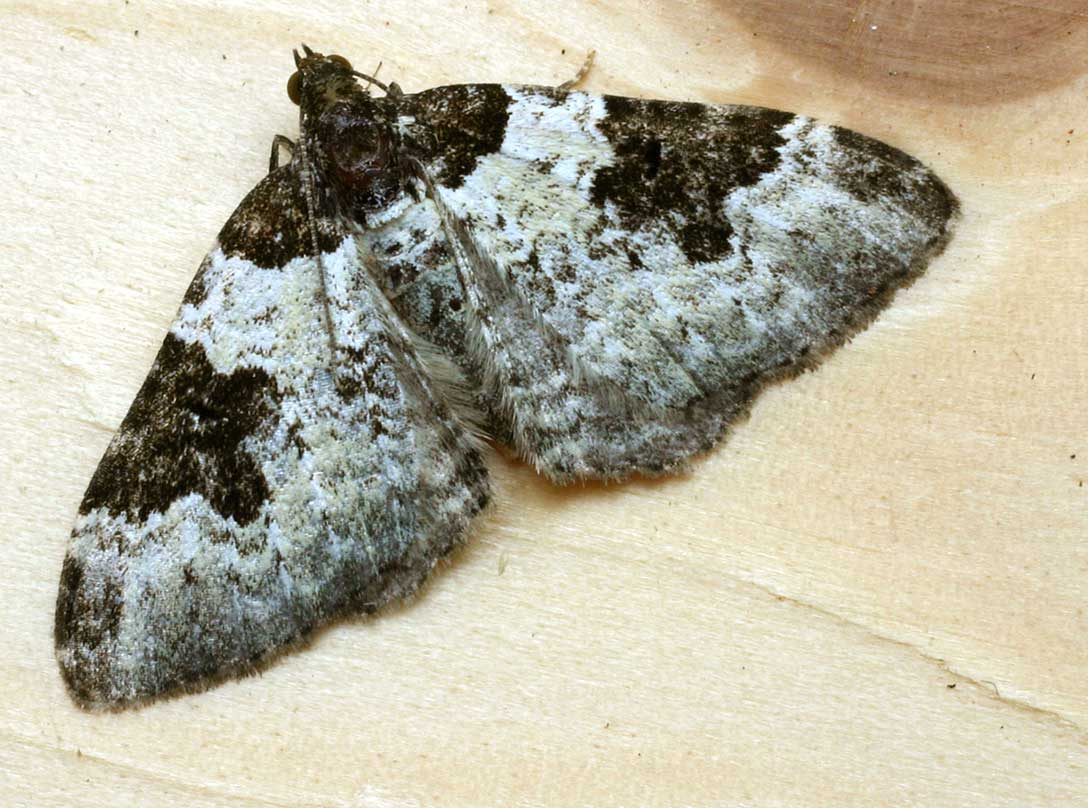
Garden carpet

- Xanthorhoe fluctuata fluctuata, garden carpet — throughout
- Scotopteryx moeniata, fortified carpet — probable rare immigrant (old records)
- Scotopteryx peribolata, Spanish sarpet — immigrant to south
- Scotopteryx bipunctaria cretata, chalk carpet — south & central (Nationally Scarce B) ‡
- Scotopteryx chenopodiata, shaded broad-bar — throughout (Vulnerable) ‡*
- Scotopteryx mucronata, lead belle

- Scotopteryx mucronata scotica — west-central & north (localized)
- Scotopteryx mucronata umbrifera — south-west (localized)

- Scotopteryx luridata plumbaria, July belle — throughout
- Catarhoe rubidata, ruddy carpet — south (Nationally Scarce B)
- Catarhoe cuculata, royal mantle — south & north (localized)
- Epirrhoe tristata, small argent and sable — north & west

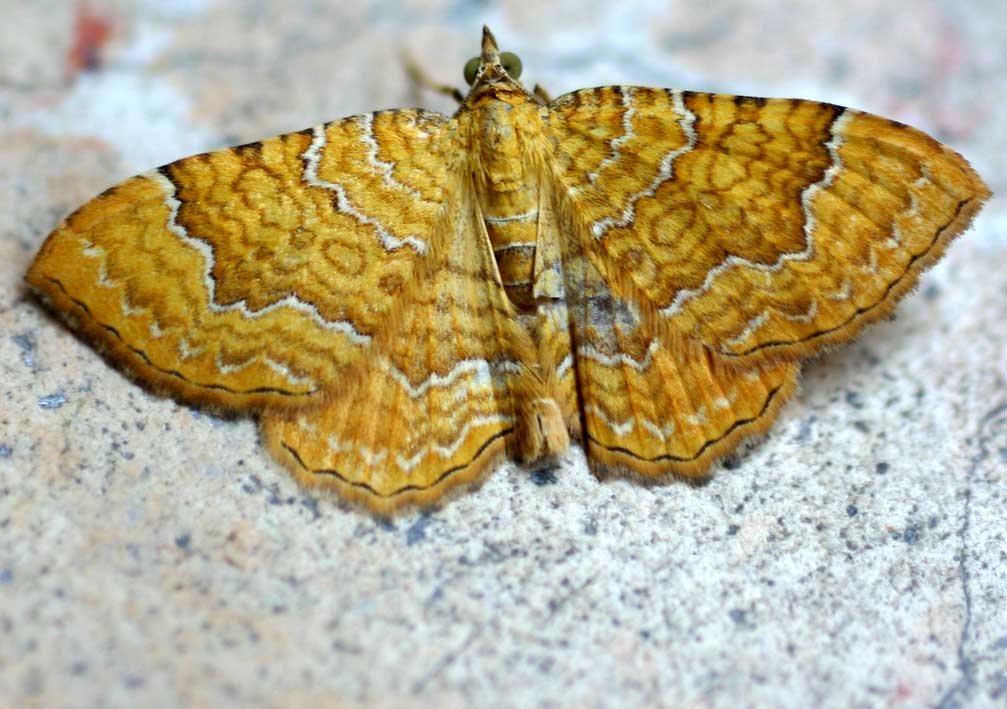
Yellow shell

- Epirrhoe alternata, common carpet

- Epirrhoe alternata obscurata — Outer Hebrides
- Epirrhoe alternata alternata — throughout

- Epirrhoe rivata, wood carpet — south & central (localized)
- Epirrhoe galiata, galium carpet — south, central & north (localized) (Vulnerable) ‡*
- Costaconvexa polygrammata, many-lined — extinct; rare immigrant
- [Costaconvexa centrostrigaria, traveller — probable import]
- Camptogramma bilineata, yellow shell

- Camptogramma bilineata bilineata — throughout
- Camptogramma bilineata atlantica — Shetland & Outer Hebrides

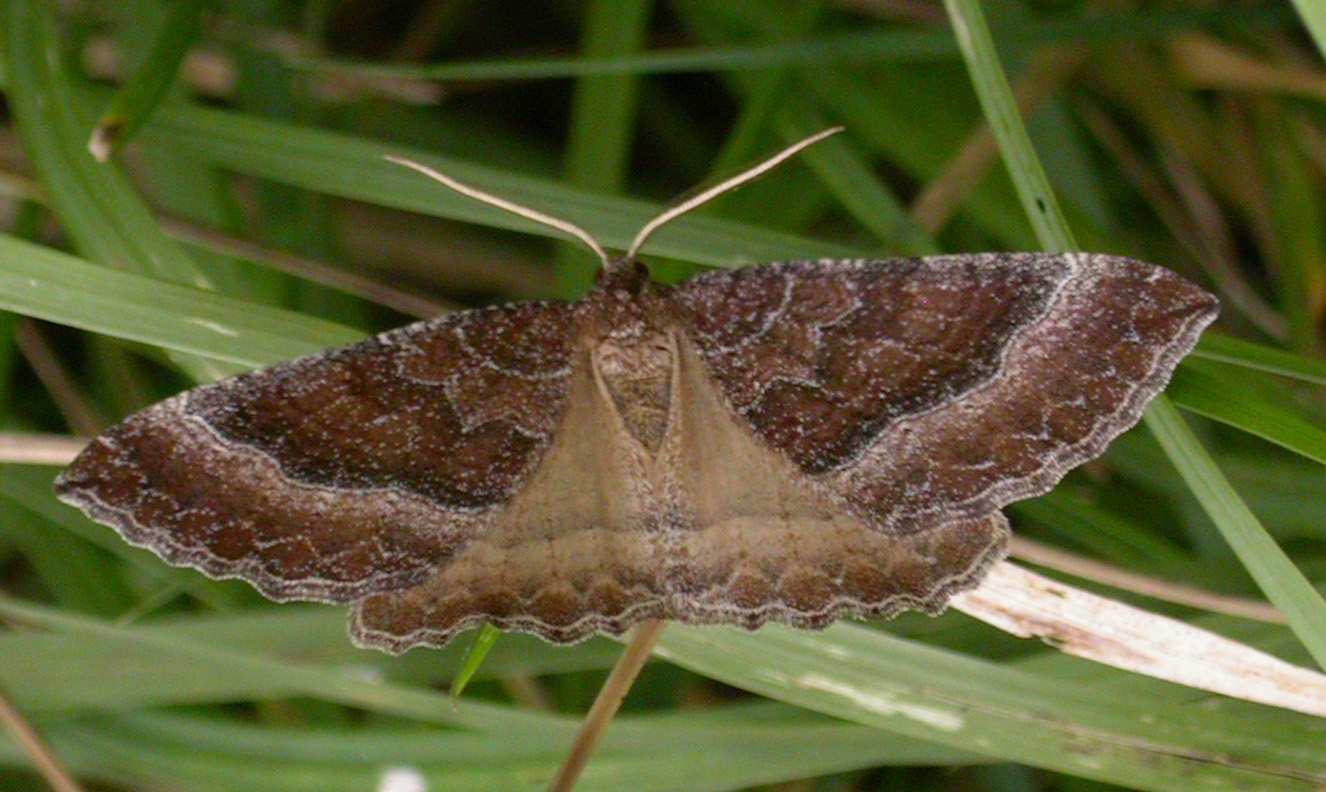
Mallow

- Entephria flavicinctata, yellow-ringed carpet

- Entephria flavicinctata flavicinctata — west coast of Scotland & Inner Hebrides, Yorkshire Dales & Black Mountains (Nationally Scarce B)
- Entephria flavicinctata ruficinctata — central & north-west Scotland (localized)

- Entephria caesiata, grey mountain moth — west-central & north (Vulnerable) ‡*
- Larentia clavaria, mallow — south, central & north
- Anticlea badiata, shoulder stripe — south, central & north
- Anticlea derivata, streamer — throughout
- Mesoleuca albicillata, beautiful carpet — south, central & north

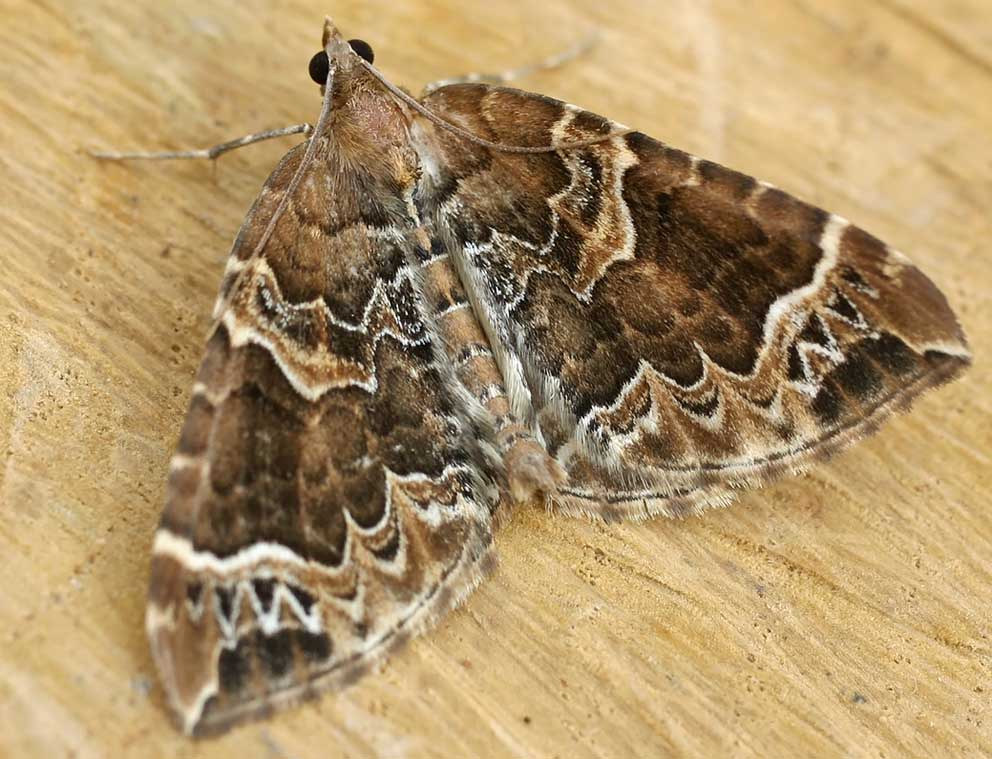
Phoenix

- Pelurga comitata, dark spinach — south, central & north (Endangered) ‡*
- Lampropteryx suffumata, water carpet — throughout
- Lampropteryx otregiata, Devon carpet — south & south-west (Nationally Scarce B)
- Cosmorhoe ocellata, purple bar — throughout
- Nebula salicata latentaria, striped twin-spot carpet — north, west & south-west
- Eulithis prunata, phoenix — throughout
- Eulithis testata, chevron — throughout
- Eulithis populata, northern spinach — south-west, west, central & north
- Eulithis mellinata, spinach — south, central & north
- Eulithis pyraliata, barred straw — throughout
- Ecliptopera silaceata, small phoenix — throughout (Vulnerable) ‡*
- Chloroclysta siterata, red–green carpet — throughout

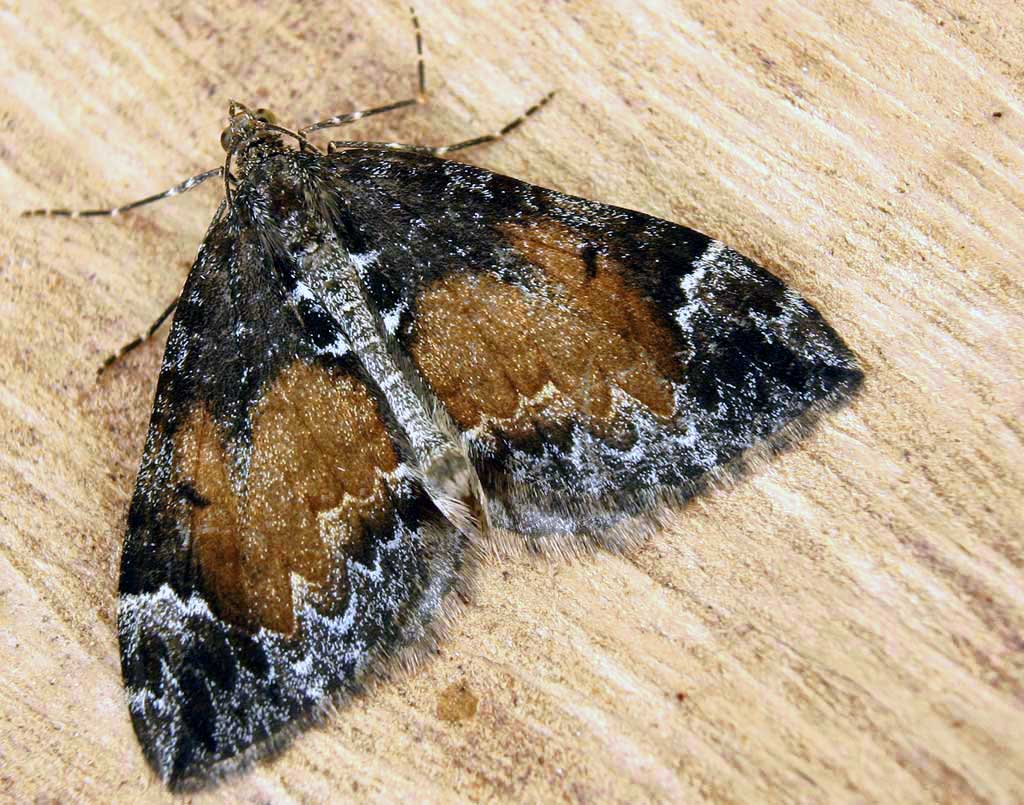
Common marbled carpet

- Chloroclysta miata, autumn green carpet — throughout (localized)
- Chloroclysta citrata, dark marbled carpet

- Chloroclysta citrata citrata — throughout
- Chloroclysta citrata pythonissata — Shetland & Orkney

- Chloroclysta concinnata, Arran carpet — north-west (Nationally Scarce A)
- Chloroclysta truncata, common marbled carpet — throughout
- Cidaria fulvata, barred yellow — throughout
- Plemyria rubiginata, blue-bordered carpet

- Plemyria rubiginata rubiginata — south & central
- Plemyria rubiginata plumbata — north (localized)

- Thera firmata, pine carpet — throughout
- Thera obeliscata, grey pine carpet — throughout
- Thera britannica, spruce carpet — throughout
- Thera cognata, chestnut-coloured carpet — central & north (Nationally Scarce B)

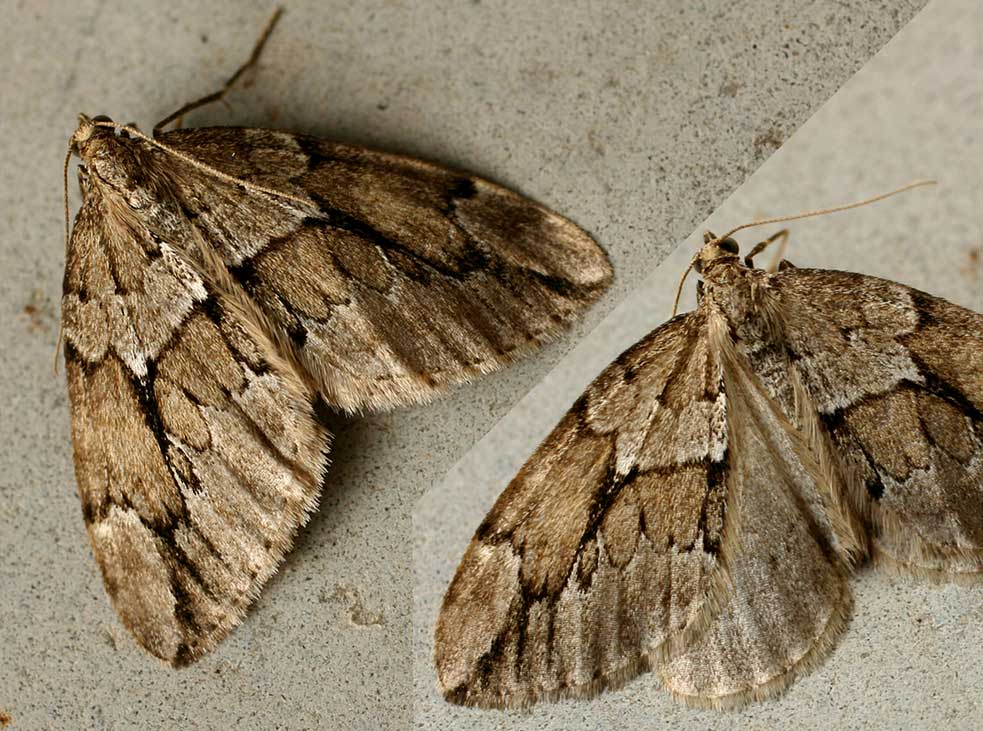
Juniper carpet

- Thera juniperata, juniper carpet

- Thera juniperata juniperata — throughout
- Thera juniperata scotica —north (localized)
- Thera juniperata orcadensis — Orkney (possibly extinct)

- Thera cupressata, cypress carpet — south-east (uncommon)
- Eustroma reticulata, netted carpet — west-central (Red Data Book) ‡
- Electrophaes corylata, broken-barred carpet — throughout
- Colostygia olivata, beech-green carpet — north, west-central & south (localized)
- Colostygia multistrigaria, mottled grey — throughout
- Colostygia pectinataria, green carpet — throughout
- Hydriomena furcata, July highflyer — throughout
- Hydriomena impluviata, May highflyer — throughout
- Hydriomena ruberata, ruddy highflyer —north, west, south & east (localized)
- Coenocalpe lapidata, slender-striped rufous — north (Nationally Scarce A)
- Horisme vitalbata, small waved umber — south & central
- Horisme tersata, fern — south & central
- [Horisme aquata, Cumbrian umber — dubious record]
- Melanthia procellata, pretty chalk carpet — south & central (Vulnerable) ‡*
- Pareulype berberata, barberry carpet — south (Red Data Book) ‡
- Spargania luctuata, white-banded carpet — south-east (Nationally Scarce A)
- Rheumaptera hastata, argent and sable ‡

- Rheumaptera hastata hastata — south & central (Nationally Scarce B)
- Rheumaptera hastata f. nigrescens — north (Nationally Scarce B)

- Rheumaptera cervinalis, scarce tissue — south & central (localized)
- Rheumaptera undulata, scallop shell — south, central & north (localized)
- Triphosa dubitata, tissue — south & central (localized)
- Philereme vetulata, brown scallop — south (not south-west) & central (localized)
- Philereme transversata britannica, dark umber — south (not south-west) & central (localized)
- Euphyia biangulata, cloaked carpet — west, south & south-east (Nationally Scarce B)
- Euphyia unangulata, sharp-angled carpet — south (localized)
- Epirrita dilutata, November moth — throughout
- Epirrita christyi, pale November moth — south, central & north
- Epirrita autumnata, autumnal moth — throughout
- Epirrita filigrammaria, small autumnal moth — north, central & west

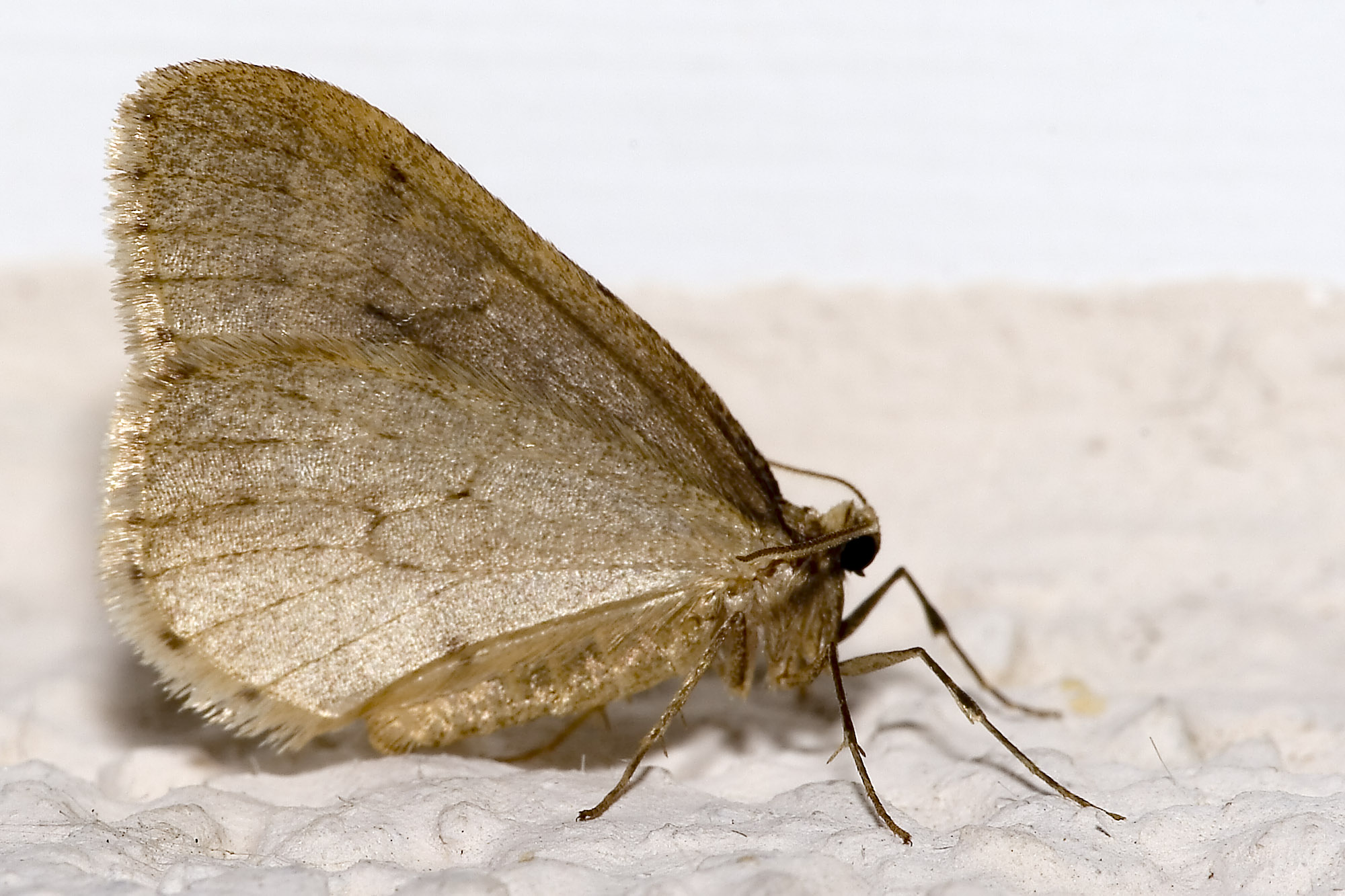
Winter moth

- Operophtera brumata, winter moth — throughout
- Operophtera fagata, northern winter moth — throughout
- Perizoma taeniata, barred carpet — central & north (Nationally Scarce A)
- Perizoma affinitata, rivulet — throughout

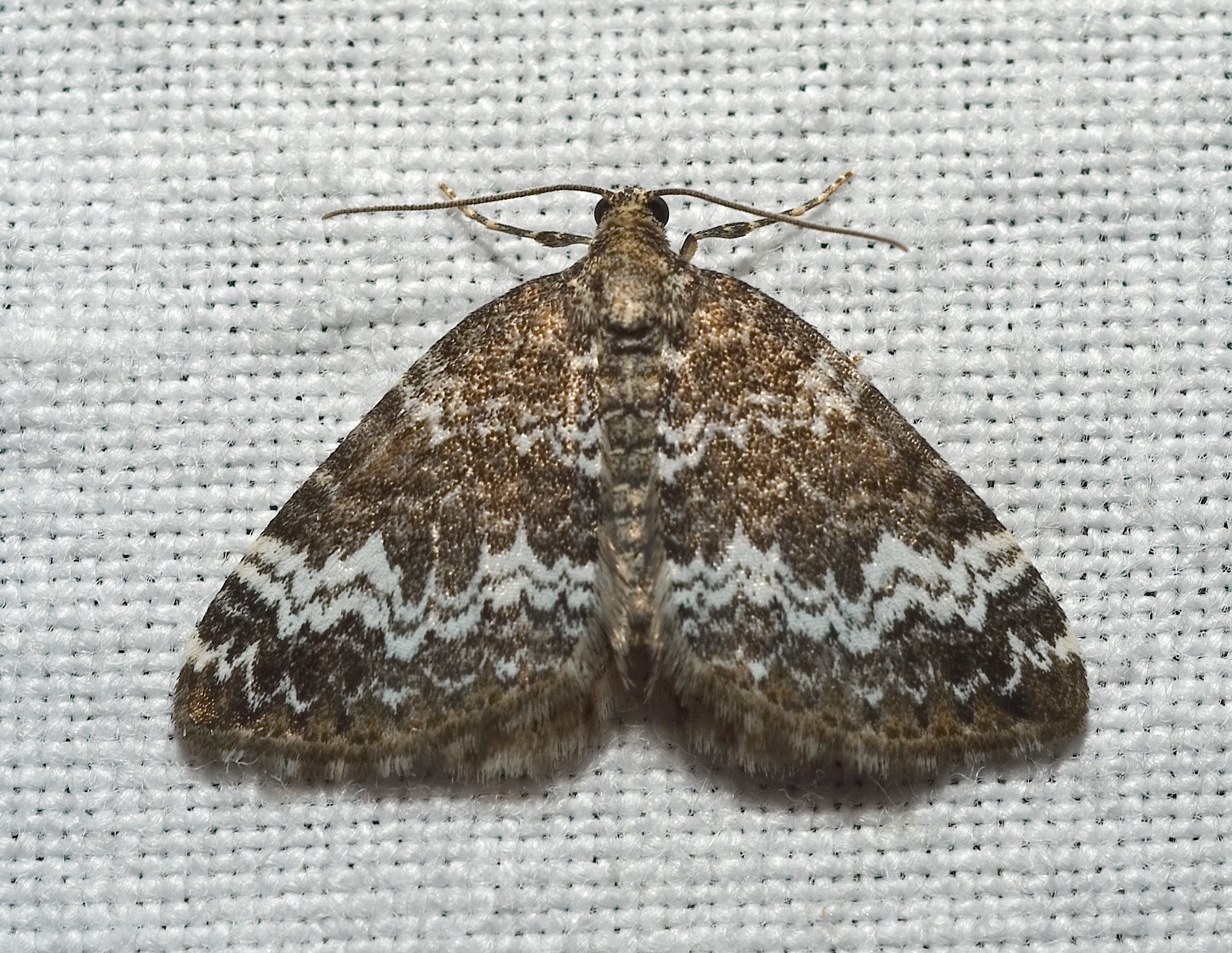
Small rivulet

- Perizoma alchemillata, small rivulet — throughout
- Perizoma bifaciata, barred rivulet — south, central & north (localized)
- Perizoma minorata ericetata, heath rivulet — north & central (Nationally Scarce B)
- Perizoma blandiata, pretty pinion

- Perizoma blandiata blandiata — north & west (local)
- Perizoma blandiata perfasciata — Hebrides & Rùm

- Perizoma albulata, grass rivulet (Endangered) ‡*

- Perizoma albulata albulata — throughout (localized)
- Perizoma albulata subfasciaria — Shetland

- Perizoma flavofasciata, sandy carpet — throughout
- Perizoma didymata, twin-spot carpet

- Perizoma didymata didymata — throughout
- Perizoma didymata hethlandica — Shetland

- Perizoma sagittata, marsh carpet — east-central (Nationally Scarce A)
- Eupithecia tenuiata, slender pug — throughout
- Eupithecia inturbata, maple pug — south & central (localized)
- Eupithecia haworthiata, Haworth's pug — south & central (localized)
- Eupithecia plumbeolata, lead-coloured pug — south, central & north-west (Nationally Scarce B)
- Eupithecia abietaria, cloaked pug — throughout
- Eupithecia linariata, toadflax pug — throughout
- Eupithecia pulchellata, foxglove pug

- Eupithecia pulchellata pulchellata — throughout
- Eupithecia pulchellata hebudium — Wales & Hebrides

- Eupithecia irriguata, marbled pug — south (Nationally Scarce B)
- Eupithecia exiguata, mottled pug

- Eupithecia exiguata exiguata — throughout
- Eupithecia exiguata muricolor — Aberdeenshire

- Eupithecia insigniata, pinion-spotted pug — south (not south-west) & central (Nationally Scarce B)
- Eupithecia valerianata, valerian pug — throughout (Nationally Scarce B)
- Eupithecia pygmaeata, marsh pug — south, central & north (Nationally Scarce B)
- Eupithecia venosata, netted pug

- Eupithecia venosata venosata — south, central & north-east (localized)
- Eupithecia venosata hebridensis — Hebrides
- Eupithecia venosata fumosae — Shetland & Orkney
- Eupithecia venosata ochracae — Orkney

- Eupithecia egenaria, Fletcher's (pauper) pug — south-west & east (Red Data Book)
- Eupithecia centaureata, lime-speck pug — throughout
- Eupithecia trisignaria, triple-spotted pug — throughout (localized)
- Eupithecia intricata

- Eupithecia intricata millieraria, Edinburgh pug — north
- Eupithecia intricata arceuthata, Freyer's pug — south & central

- Eupithecia satyrata, satyr pug

- Eupithecia satyrata callunaria — south (localized)
- Eupithecia satyrata satyrata — north (moorlands)
- Eupithecia satyrata curzoni — Shetland

- [Eupithecia cauchiata, Doubleday's pug — single old record, Essex]
- Eupithecia absinthiata, wormwood pug — throughout

- Eupithecia absinthiata f. goossensiata, ling pug — throughout (localized, especially heathland and moorland)

- Eupithecia assimilata, currant pug — throughout
- Eupithecia expallidata, bleached pug — south-east, west & north (Nationally Scarce B)
- Eupithecia vulgata, common pug

- Eupithecia vulgata vulgata — south & central
- Eupithecia vulgata scotica — north

- Eupithecia tripunctaria, white-spotted pug — south, central & north (localized)
- Eupithecia denotata

- Eupithecia denotata denotata, campanula pug — south & east (Nationally Scarce A)
- Eupithecia denotata jasioneata, jasione pug — south-west & west-central (Nationally Scarce A)

- Eupithecia subfuscata, grey pug — throughout
- Eupithecia icterata subfulvata, tawny speckled pug — throughout
- Eupithecia succenturiata, bordered pug — south, central & north
- Eupithecia subumbrata, shaded pug — throughout (localized)
- Eupithecia millefoliata, yarrow pug — south-east (Nationally Scarce B)
- Eupithecia simpliciata, plain pug — south & central (localized)
- Eupithecia sinuosaria, goosefoot pug — probable rare immigrant
- Eupithecia distinctaria constrictata, thyme pug — throughout (except south-east) (Nationally Scarce B)
- Eupithecia indigata, ochreous pug — throughout
- Eupithecia pimpinellata, pimpinel pug — south & central (localized)
- Eupithecia nanata, narrow-winged pug — throughout
- Eupithecia extensaria occidua, scarce pug — east-central (Red Data Book) ‡
- Eupithecia innotata, angle-barred pug — throughout
- Eupithecia fraxinata, ash pug — throughout
- Eupithecia tamarisciata, tamarisk pug — south (uncommon on alien Tamarisk)

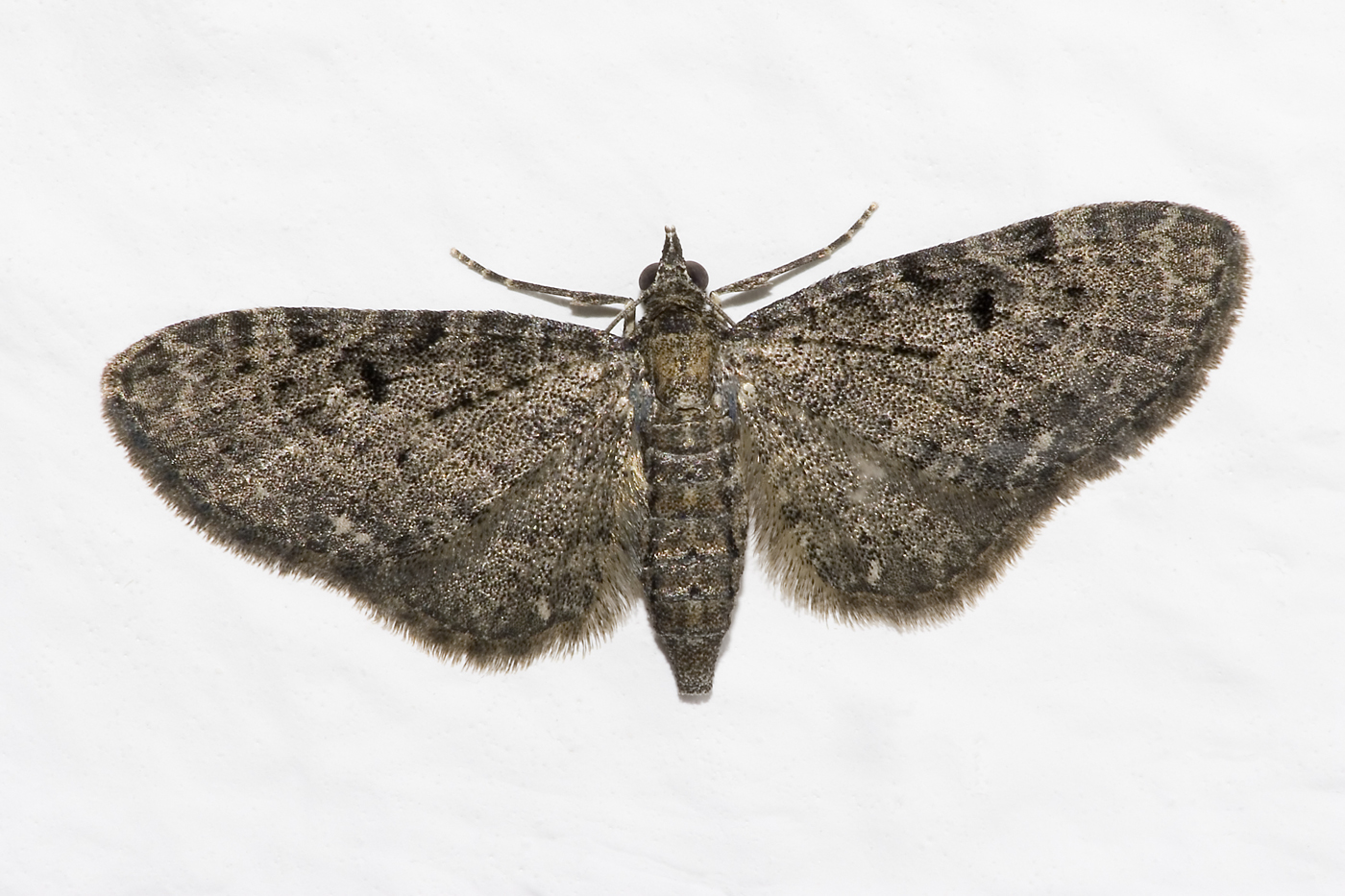
Golden-rod pug

- Eupithecia virgaureata, golden-rod pug — west & east (localized)
- Eupithecia abbreviata, brindled pug — throughout

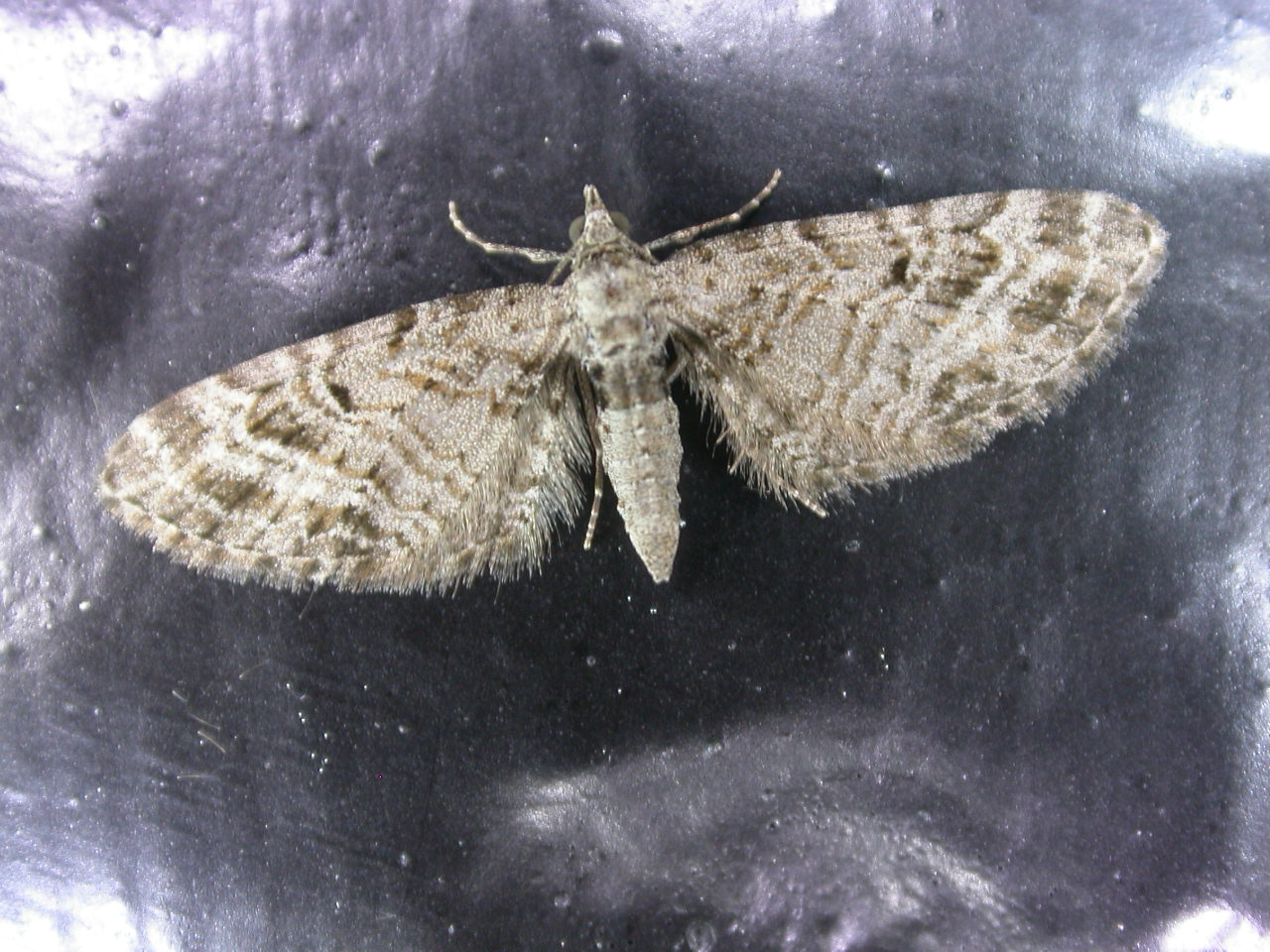
Oak-tree pug

- Eupithecia dodoneata, oak-tree pug —south & central
- Eupithecia pusillata, juniper pug

- Eupithecia pusillata pusillata — throughout
- Eupithecia pusillata anglicata — extinct

- Eupithecia phoeniceata, cypress pug — south (uncommon)
- Eupithecia ultimaria, Channel Islands pug — south (uncommon)
- Eupithecia lariciata, larch pug — throughout
- Eupithecia tantillaria, dwarf pug — throughout

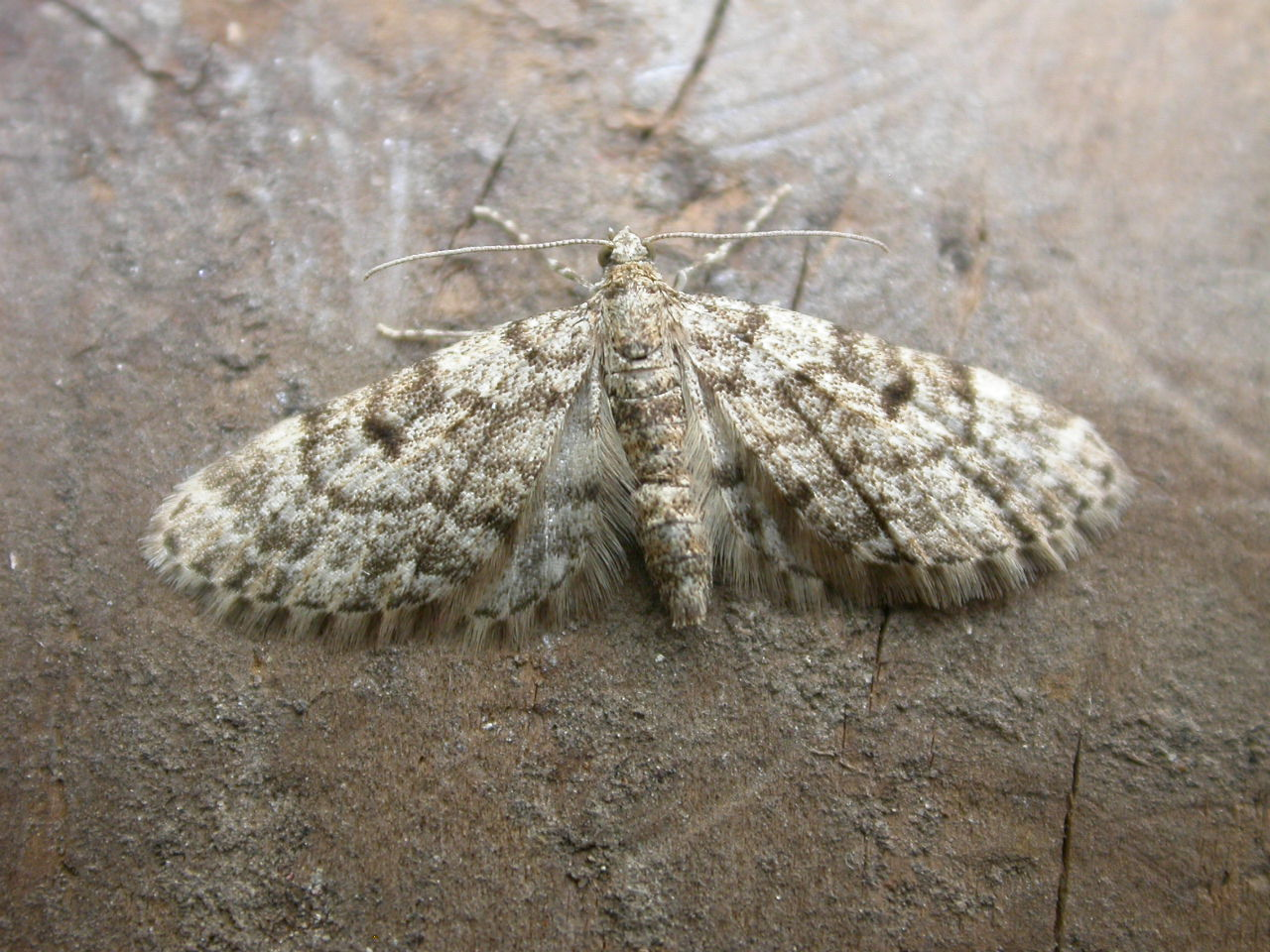
Dwarf pug

- Chloroclystis v-ata, v-pug — throughout

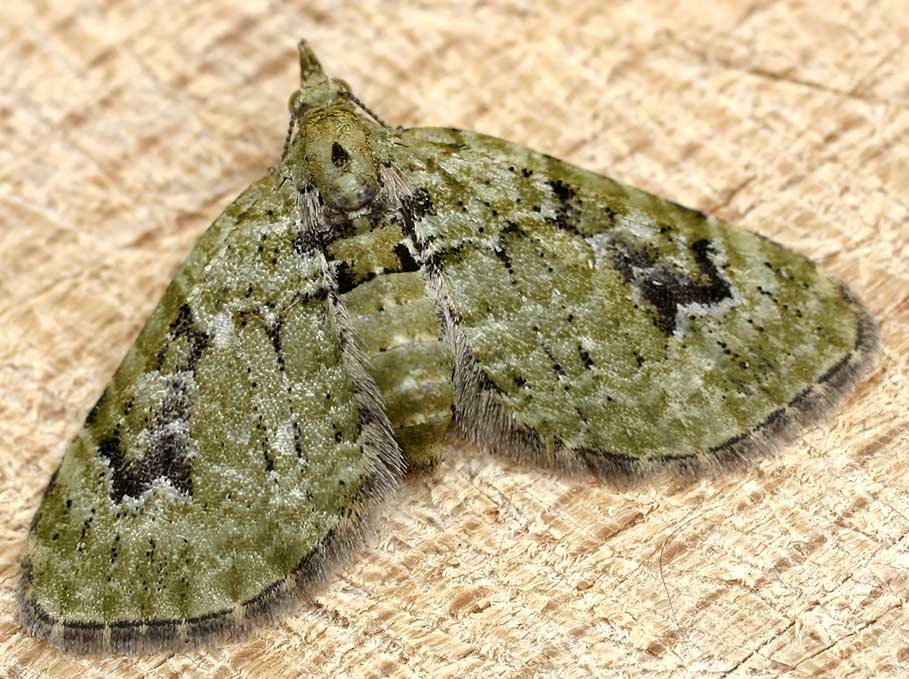
V-pug

- Pasiphila chloerata, sloe pug — south & central
- Pasiphila rectangulata, green pug — throughout
- Pasiphila debiliata, bilberry pug — south & west (Nationally Scarce B)
- Gymnoscelis rufifasciata, double-striped pug — throughout
- Anticollix sparsata, dentated pug — south & central (Nationally Scarce A)
- Chesias legatella, streak — throughout (Vulnerable) ‡*
- Chesias rufata, broom-tip (Vulnerable) ‡*

- Chesias rufata rufata — south-east & west (Nationally Scarce B)
- Chesias rufata scotica — north (Nationally Scarce B)

- Carsia sororiata anglica, Manchester treble-bar — north & central (Nationally Scarce B)
- Aplocera plagiata, treble bar

- Aplocera plagiata plagiata — throughout
- Aplocera plagiata scotica — north

- Aplocera efformata, lesser treble-bar —south & central
- Aplocera praeformata, purple treble-bar — probable immigrant (2 records)
- Odezia atrata, chimney sweeper — north, central & south
- Lithostege griseata, grey carpet — east (Red Data Book) ‡
- Discoloxia blomeri, Blomer's rivulet — south, central & west (Nationally Scarce B)
- Venusia cambrica, Welsh wave — west & north (localized)
- Euchoeca nebulata, dingy shell — south & central (localized)
- Asthena albulata, small white wave — throughout
- Hydrelia flammeolaria, small yellow wave — throughout
- Hydrelia sylvata, waved carpet — west, south-east & south-west (Nationally Scarce B)
- Minoa murinata, drab looper — west, south & south-west (Nationally Scarce B) ‡
- Lobophora halterata, seraphim — throughout
- Trichopteryx polycommata, barred tooth-striped — throughout (Nationally Scarce A) ‡
- Trichopteryx carpinata, early tooth-striped — throughout
- Pterapherapteryx sexalata, small seraphim — throughout
- Acasis viretata, yellow-barred brindle — south, central & north-west (localized)

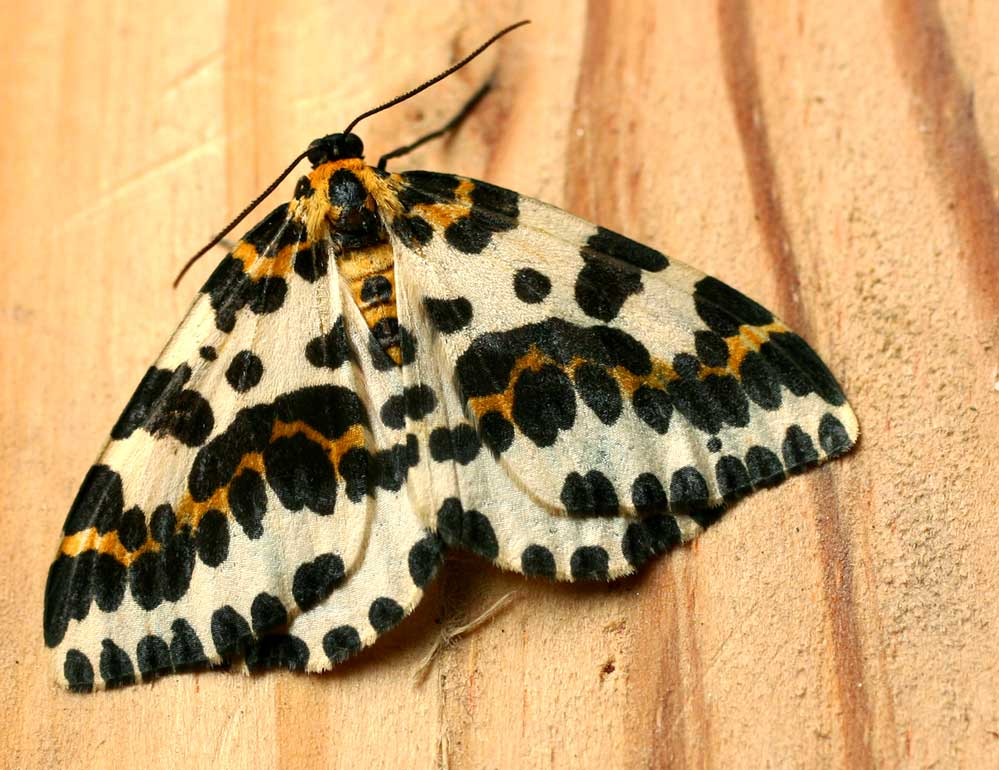
Magpie moth

- Abraxas grossulariata, magpie moth — throughout
- Abraxas sylvata, clouded magpie — south & central (localized)
- [Abraxas pantaria, light magpie — unconfirmed old record]
- Lomaspilis marginata, clouded border — throughout
- Ligdia adustata, scorched carpet — south & central (localized)
- Stegania trimaculata, Dorset cream wave — rare immigrant
- Stegania cararia, ringed border — rare immigrant
- Macaria notata, peacock moth — south, west-central & north-west (localized)

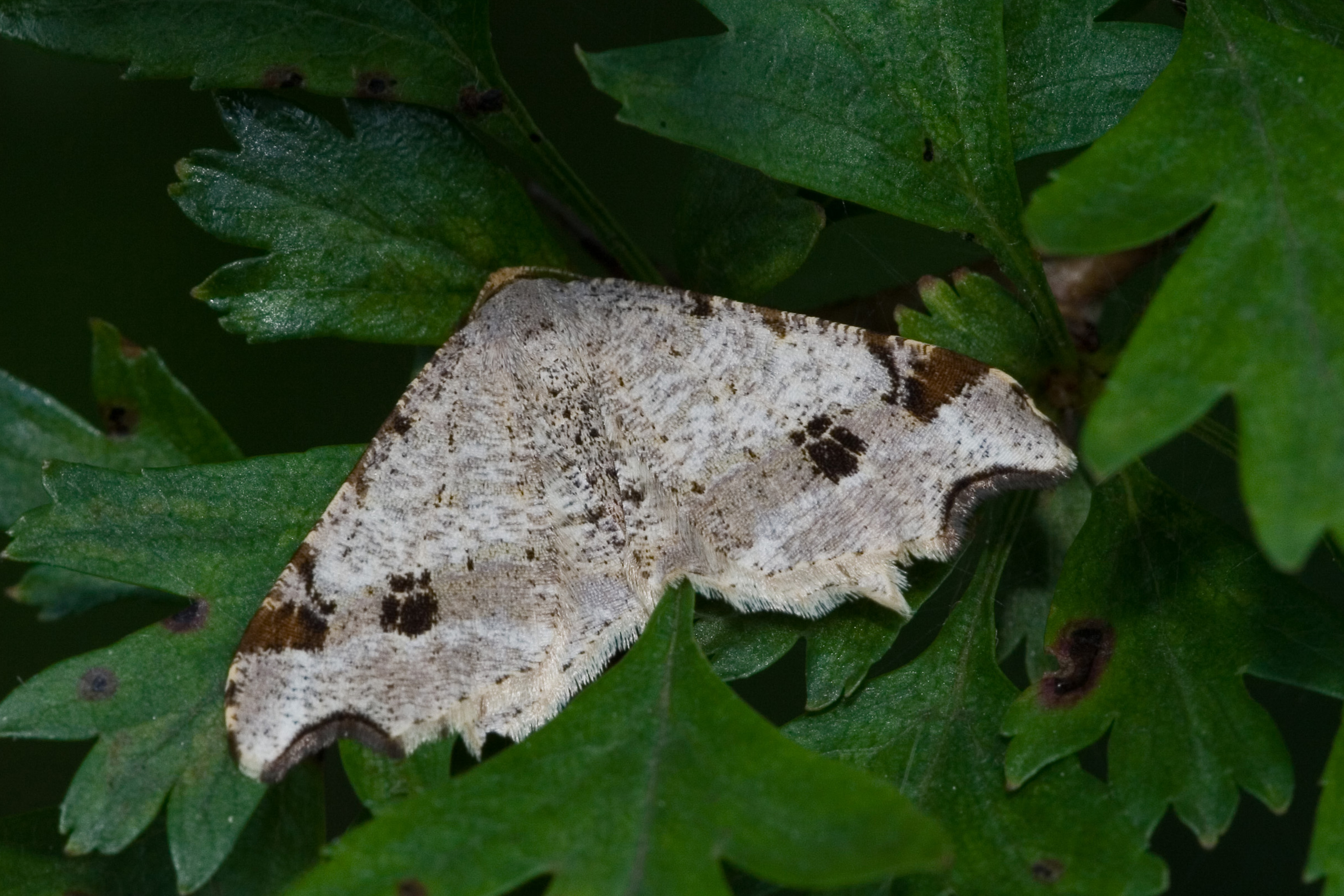
Sharp-angled peacock

- Macaria alternata, sharp-angled peacock — south & central (localized)
- Macaria signaria, dusky peacock — immigrant
- [Macaria bicolorata praeatomata, dingy angle — dubious very old record]
- Macaria liturata, tawny-barred angle — throughout
- Macaria carbonaria, netted mountain moth — north-east (Red Data Book) ‡
- Macaria wauaria, v-moth — throughout (localized) ‡*
- Chiasmia clathrata clathrata, latticed heath — south, central & north (Vulnerable) ‡*
- Itame brunneata, Rannoch looper — north-east (Nationally Scarce A)
- [Hypagyrtis unipunctata, white spot — dubious very old record]
- Isturgia limbaria, frosted yellow — presumed extinct
- [Nematocampa limbata, bordered chequer — dubious very old record]
- Cepphis advenaria, little thorn — west & south (not south-west) (Nationally Scarce B)
- Petrophora chlorosata, brown silver-line — throughout
- Plagodis pulveraria, barred umber — throughout (localized)

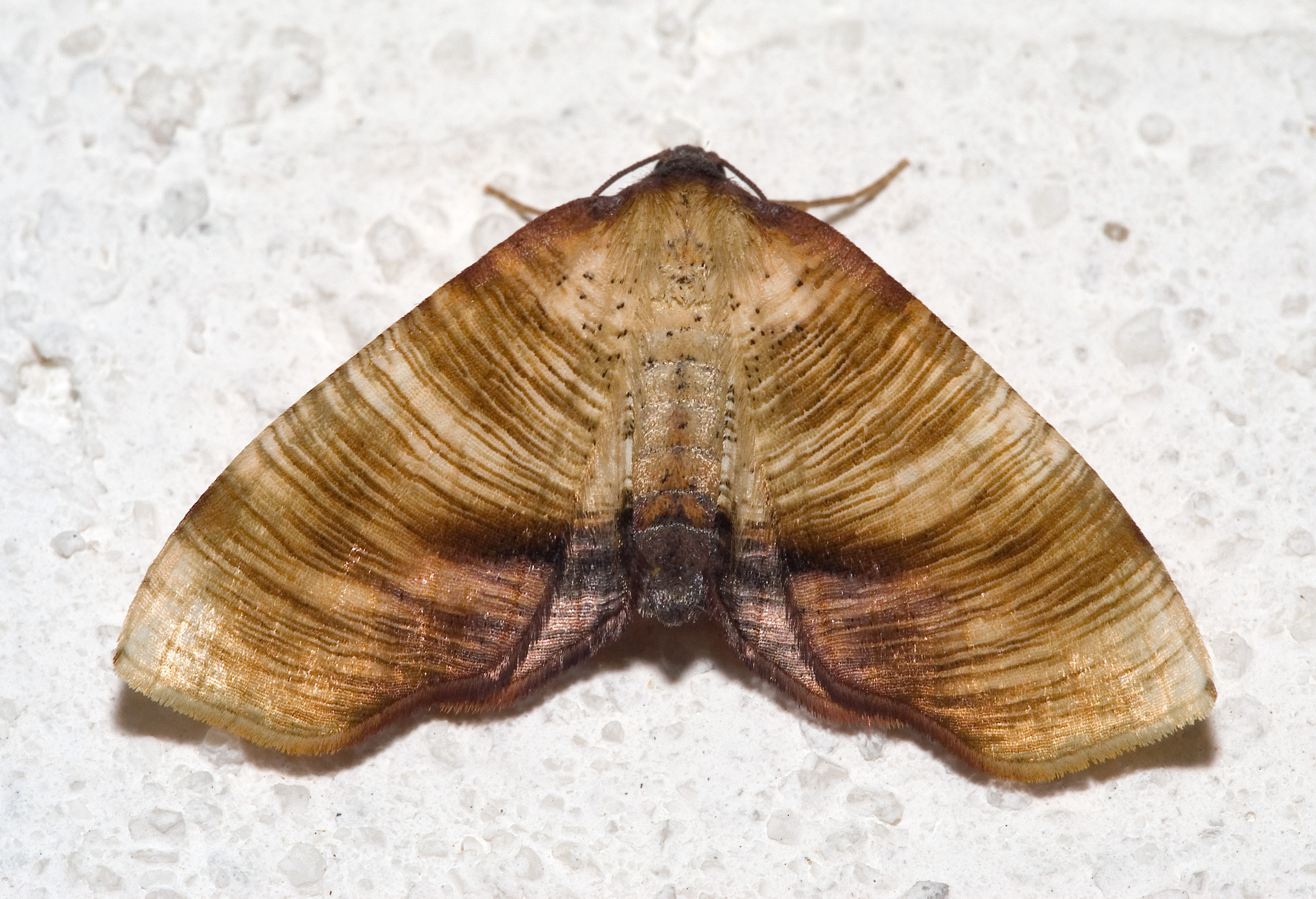
Scorched wing

- Plagodis dolabraria, scorched wing — throughout (localized)
- Pachycnemia hippocastanaria, horse chestnut — south & east-central (Nationally Scarce B)
- Opisthograptis luteolata, brimstone moth — throughout
- Epione repandaria, bordered beauty — throughout
- Epione vespertaria, dark bordered beauty — north-east (Red Data Book) ‡
- Pseudopanthera macularia, speckled yellow — throughout
- Apeira syringaria, lilac beauty — south & central (localized)
- Ennomos autumnaria, large thorn — south-east (Nationally Scarce B)
- Ennomos quercinaria, August thorn — south & central (localized) (Vulnerable) ‡*
- Ennomos alniaria, canary-shouldered thorn — throughout
- Ennomos fuscantaria, dusky thorn — south & central (Endangered) ‡*
- Ennomos erosaria, September thorn — south, central & north (Endangered) ‡*
- [Ennomos quercaria, clouded August thorn — unconfirmed records]
- [Ennomos subsignaria — probable import]

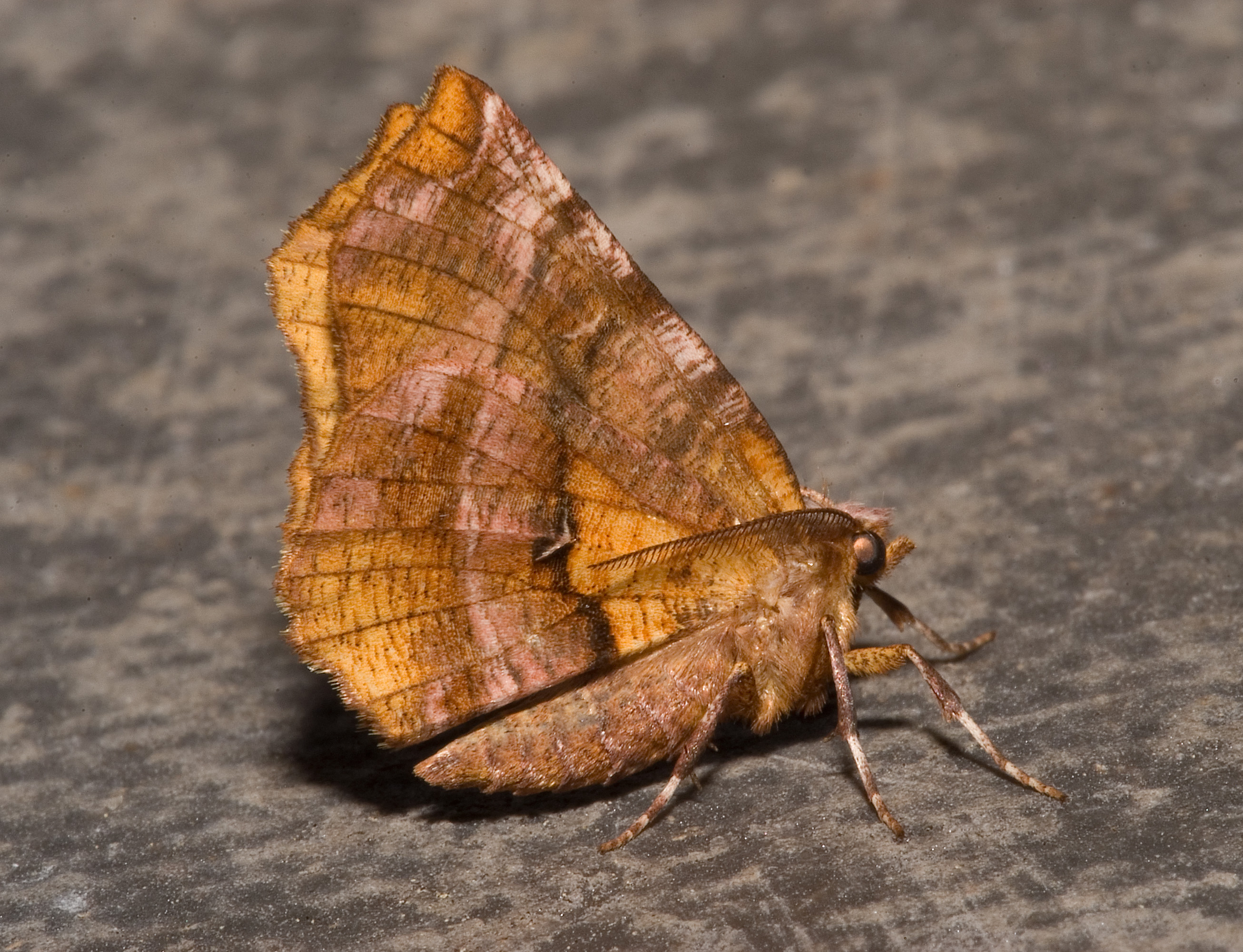
Early thorn

- Selenia dentaria, early thorn — throughout
- Selenia lunularia, lunar thorn — throughout (localized)
- Selenia tetralunaria, purple thorn — south, central & north
- Odontopera bidentata, scalloped hazel — throughout
- Crocallis elinguaria, scalloped oak — throughout
- Ourapteryx sambucaria, swallow-tailed moth — throughout
- Colotois pennaria, feathered thorn — throughout
- Angerona prunaria, orange moth — south (localized)
- Apocheima hispidaria, small brindled beauty — south & central (localized)
- Apocheima pilosaria, pale brindled beauty — throughout
- Lycia hirtaria, brindled beauty — south, central & north (Vulnerable) ‡*
- Lycia zonaria, belted beauty

- Lycia zonaria britannica — west-central (Red Data Book)
- Lycia zonaria atlantica — north-west (Nationally Scarce A)

- Lycia lapponaria scotica, Rannoch brindled beauty — north (Nationally Scarce A)
- Biston strataria, oak beauty — south, central & north

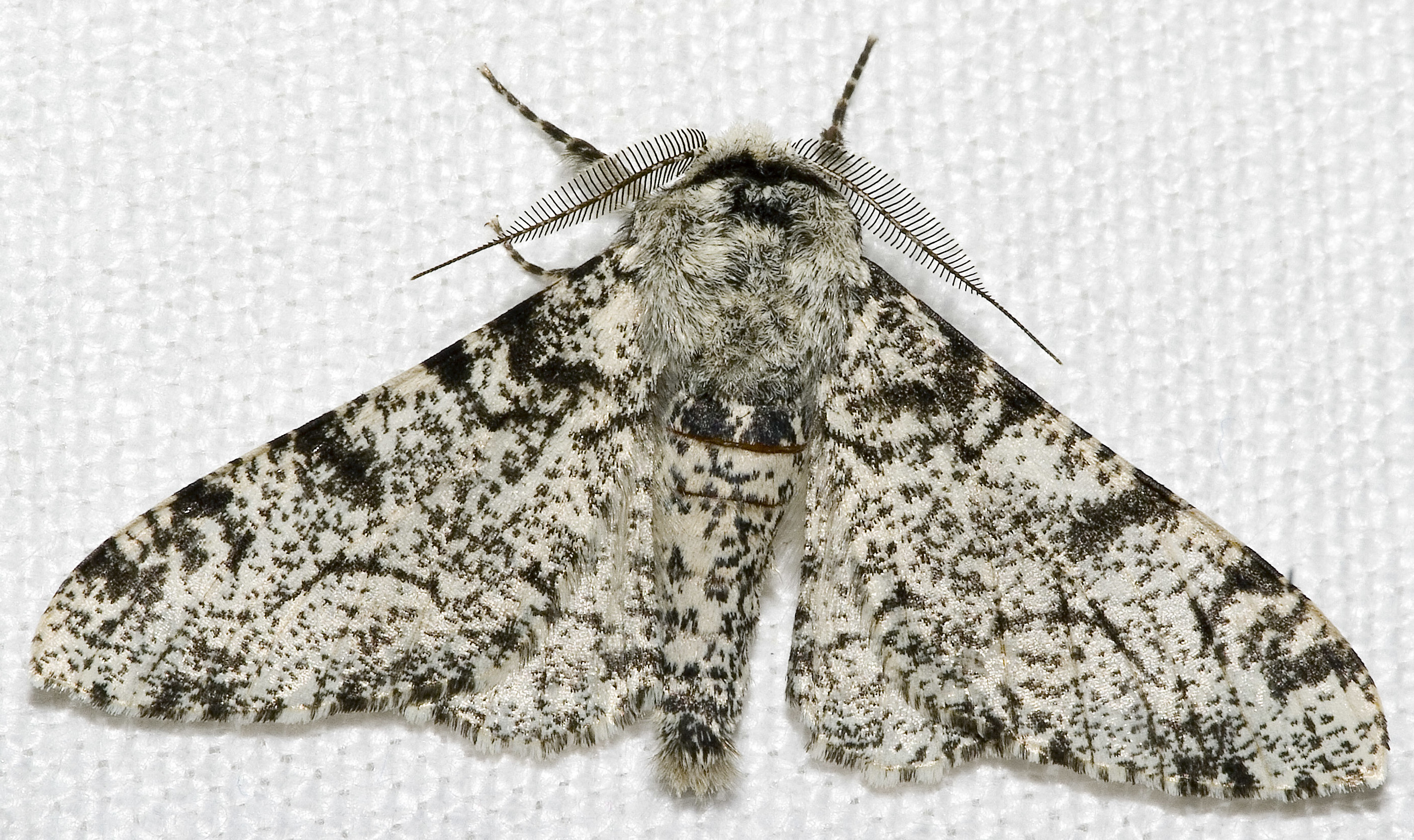
Peppered moth

- Biston betularia, peppered moth — throughout
- Agriopis leucophaearia, spring usher — throughout
- Agriopis aurantiaria, scarce umber — throughout
- Agriopis marginaria, dotted border — throughout
- Erannis defoliaria, mottled umber — throughout
- Menophra abruptaria, waved umber — south & central
- Peribatodes rhomboidaria, willow beauty — south, central & north
- Peribatodes secundaria, feathered beauty — south-east (uncommon on alien Norway spruce)
- Peribatodes ilicaria, Lydd beauty — rare immigrant to south-east
- Selidosema brunnearia scandinaviaria, bordered grey — south, west-central, north-west & north-east (Nationally Scarce A)
- Cleora cinctaria, ringed carpet

- Cleora cinctaria bowesi — north-west & west-central (Nationally Scarce A)
- Cleora cinctaria cinctaria — south (Nationally Scarce A)

- Deileptenia ribeata, satin beauty — throughout
- Alcis repandata, mottled beauty

- Alcis repandata repandata — throughout
- Alcis repandata sodorensium — Hebrides

- Alcis jubata, dotted carpet — west & north (localized)
- Hypomecis roboraria, great oak beauty — south & central (Nationally Scarce B)
- Hypomecis punctinalis, pale oak beauty — south
- Cleorodes lichenaria, Brussels lace — west, west-central, south & north (localized)
- Fagivorina arenaria, speckled beauty — extinct
- Ectropis bistortata, engrailed — throughout
- Ectropis crepuscularia, small engrailed — south, central & north (localized)
- Paradarisa consonaria, square spot — south & west (localized)
- Parectropis similaria, brindled white-spot — south (localized)
- Aethalura punctulata, grey birch — south, central & north

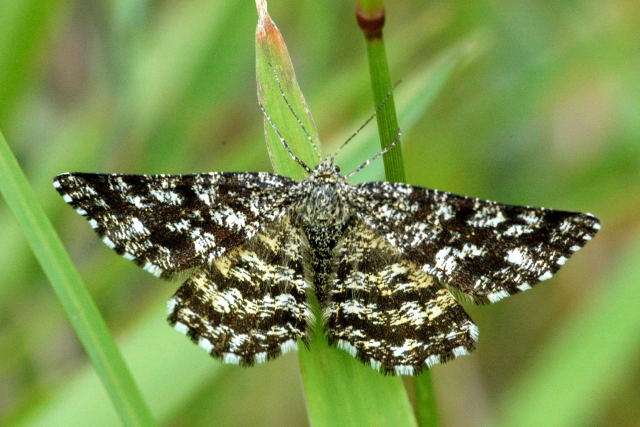
Common heath (female)

- Ematurga atomaria, common heath — throughout
- Tephronia sepiaria, dusky carpet — probable immigrant
- Bupalus piniaria, bordered white — throughout
- Cabera pusaria, common white wave — throughout
- Cabera exanthemata, common wave — throughout
- Lomographa bimaculata, white-pinion spotted — south & west-central
- Lomographa temerata, clouded silver — south, central & north
- Aleucis distinctata, sloe carpet — south-east & south (Nationally Scarce B) ‡
- Theria primaria, early moth — south, central & north

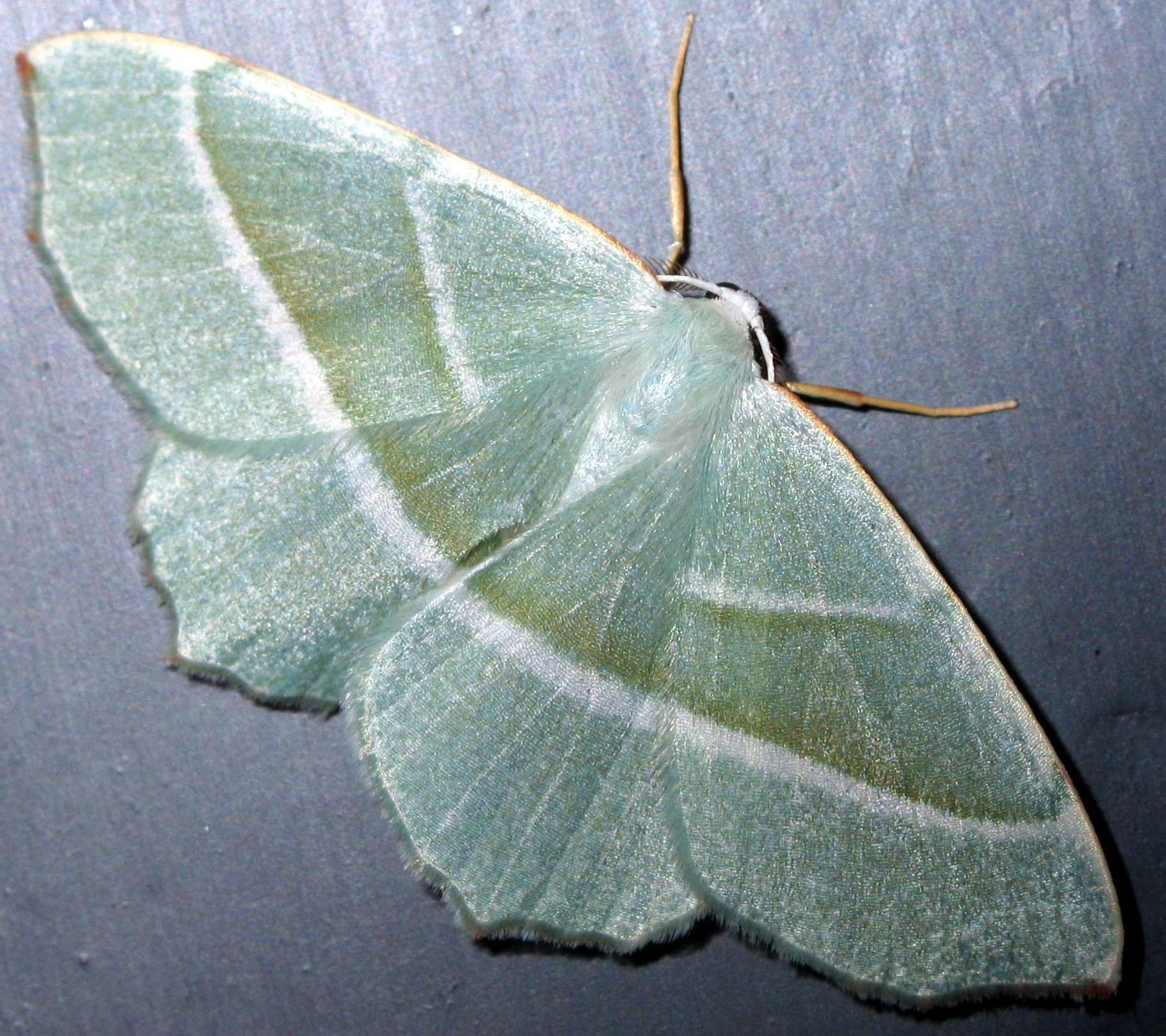
Light emerald

- Campaea margaritata, light emerald — throughout
- Hylaea fasciaria, barred red — throughout
- Gnophos obfuscata, Scotch (Scottish) annulet — north (Nationally Scarce B)
- Charissa obscurata, annulet — throughout
- Glacies coracina, black mountain moth — north (Nationally Scarce A)
- Siona lineata, black-veined moth — south-east (Red Data Book) ‡
- Aspitates gilvaria gilvaria, straw belle — south-east (Red Data Book) ‡
- Semiaspilates ochrearia, yellow belle — south (localized)
- Dyscia fagaria, grey scalloped bar — throughout (localized)
- Perconia strigillaria, grass wave — throughout (localized)

Species listed in the 2007 UK Biodiversity Action Plan (BAP) are indicated by a double-dagger symbol (‡)—species so listed for research purposes only are also indicated with an asterisk (‡*).

== See also ==
- List of moths of Great Britain (overview)
  - Family lists: Hepialidae, Cossidae, Zygaenidae, Limacodidae, Sesiidae, Lasiocampidae, Saturniidae, Endromidae, Drepanidae, Thyatiridae, Geometridae, Sphingidae, Notodontidae, Thaumetopoeidae, Lymantriidae, Arctiidae, Ctenuchidae, Nolidae, Noctuidae and Micromoths
