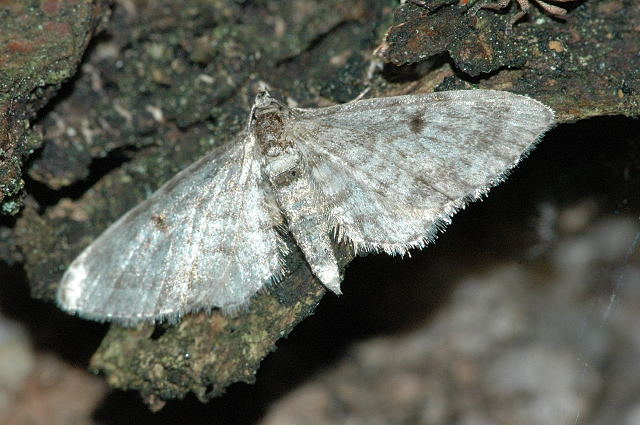

Scientific classification
- Kingdom: Animalia
- Phylum: Arthropoda
- Class: Insecta
- Order: Lepidoptera
- Family: Geometridae
- Genus: Eupithecia
- Species: E. indigata

Binomial name
- Eupithecia indigata (Hübner, 1813)

Synonyms
- Geometra indigata Hubner, 1813; Tephroclystia turfosata Draudt, 1903; Eupithecia pliniata Stauder, 1929; Eupithecia indigata hamamata Pinker, 1976

= Eupithecia indigata =

Species of moth

Eupithecia indigata, the ochreous pug, is a moth of the family Geometridae. The species can be found in Europe. and across the Palearctic as far as the Altai Mountains It primarily colonizes pine forests, mixed pine forests and pine plantations. In the Alps it rises to heights of 1800 metres.

The wingspan is 15–18 mm. The length of the forewings is 8–10 mm. The ground colour of the forewings is pale ochreous brown. The crosslines are fine and indistinct and there is series of small darker dusky marks along the costa. There is a small black discal spot. The hindwings are pale becoming darker towards the outer margin. Identification requires examination of the genitalia. See also Prout.

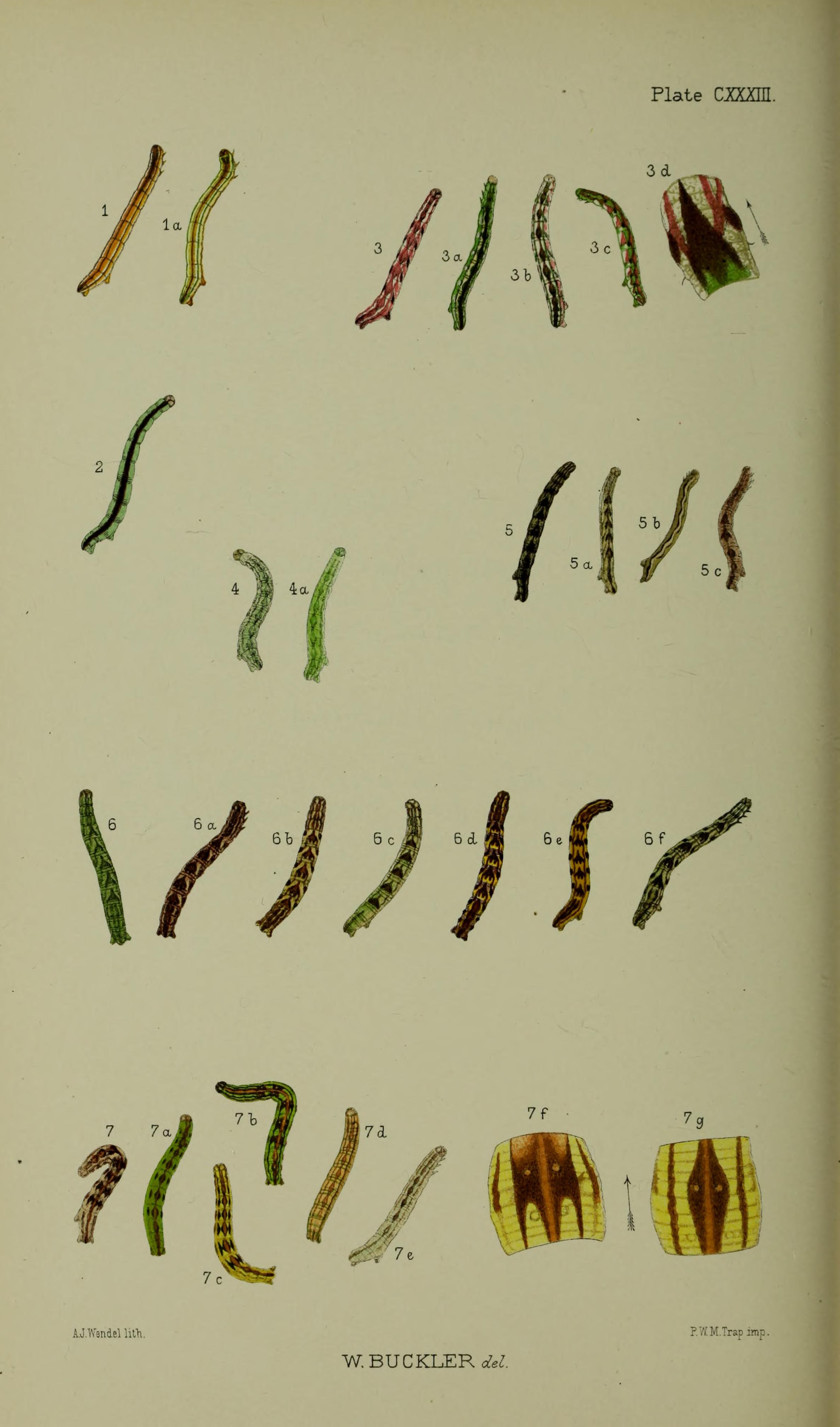
Figs.1,1a larvae after final moult

The larva is naked, bright greenish brown, with a light reddish-brown dorsal line and yellowish side stripes. The back of the head and the anus flap are dark brown. The light brown pupa has dark brown wing sheaths. There are eight equally long hook bristles on the cremaster.

The moths fly in one generation from April to May.

The caterpillars feed on Pinus sylvestris and Larix.
