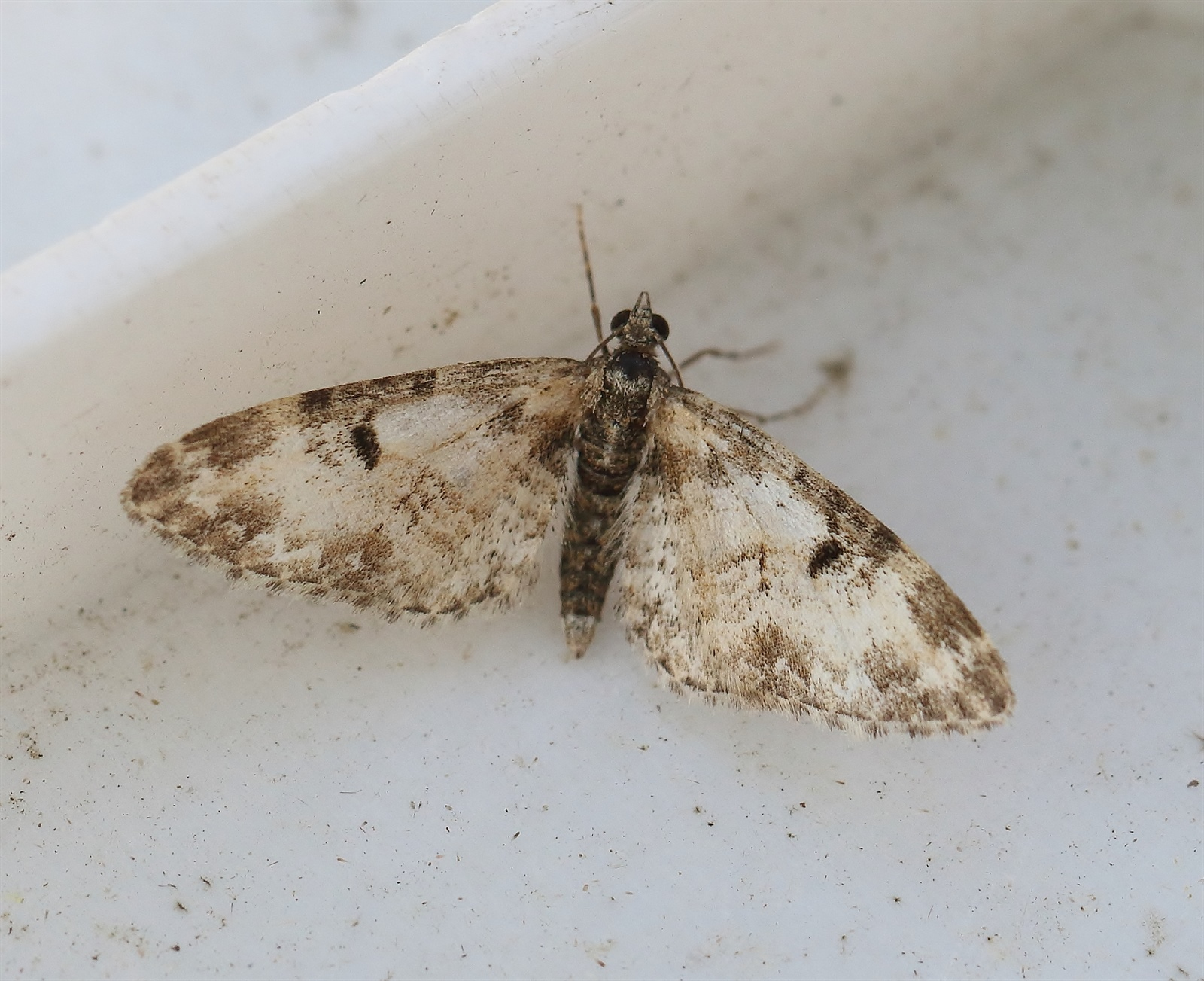

Scientific classification
- Domain: Eukaryota
- Kingdom: Animalia
- Phylum: Arthropoda
- Class: Insecta
- Order: Lepidoptera
- Family: Geometridae
- Genus: Eupithecia
- Species: E. irriguata

Binomial name
- Eupithecia irriguata (Hübner, 1813)

Synonyms
- Geometra irriguata Hubner, 1813; Phalaena variegata Haworth, 1809; Eupithecia staudingeri Bohatsch, 1893

= Eupithecia irriguata =

Species of moth

Eupithecia irriguata, the marbled pug, is a moth of the family Geometridae. The species can be found in Europe and North Africa.

The wingspan is 18–20 mm and the moths fly from April to June, depending on the location. The larvae feed on the leaves of oak (Quercus species).

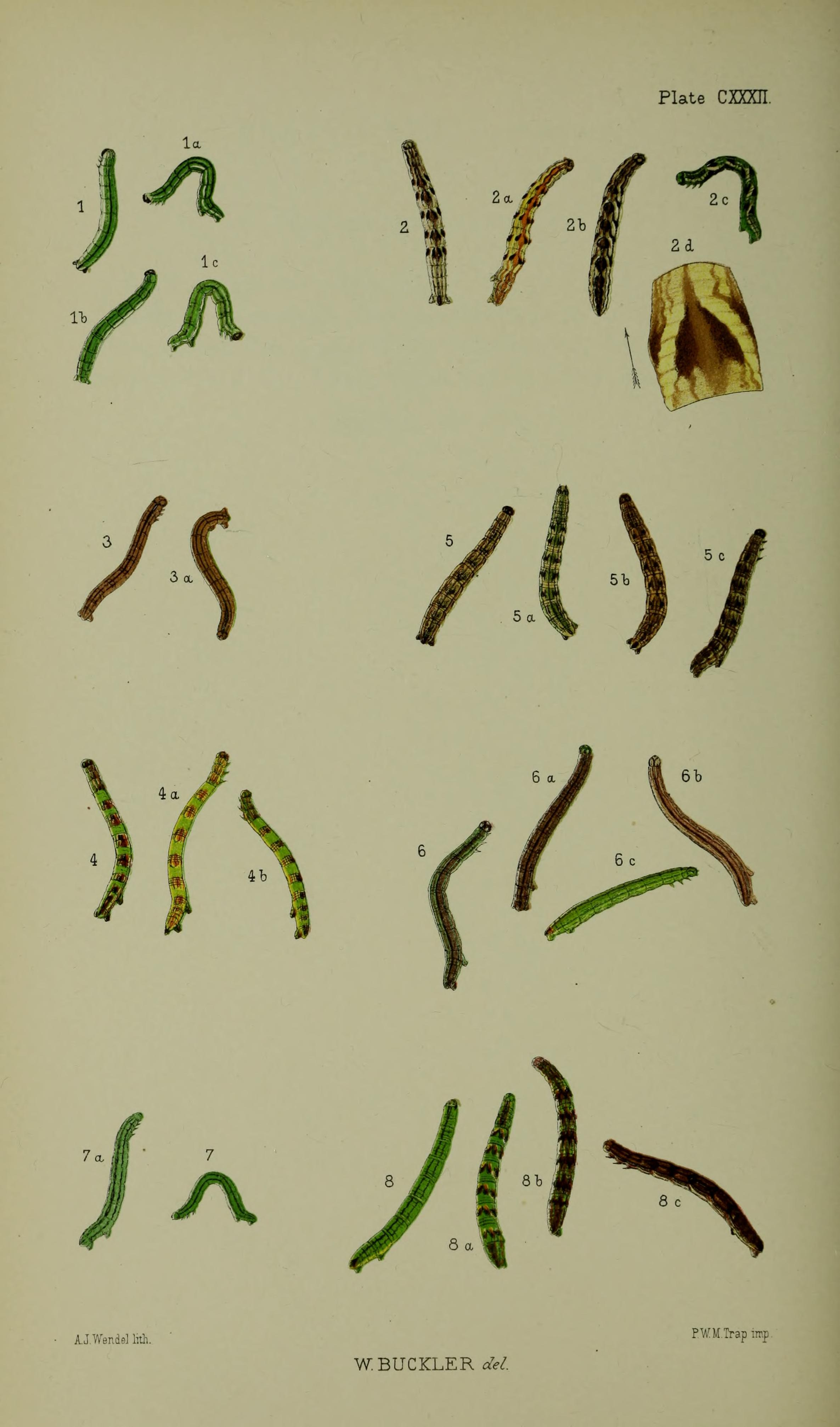
Figs 4,4a,4b larvae after final moult

== Subspecies ==
- Eupithecia irriguata irriguata
- Eupithecia irriguata eriguata Staudinger, 1871
- Eupithecia irriguata kurdica Prout 1938
- Eupithecia irriguata staudingeri Bohatsch, 1893
