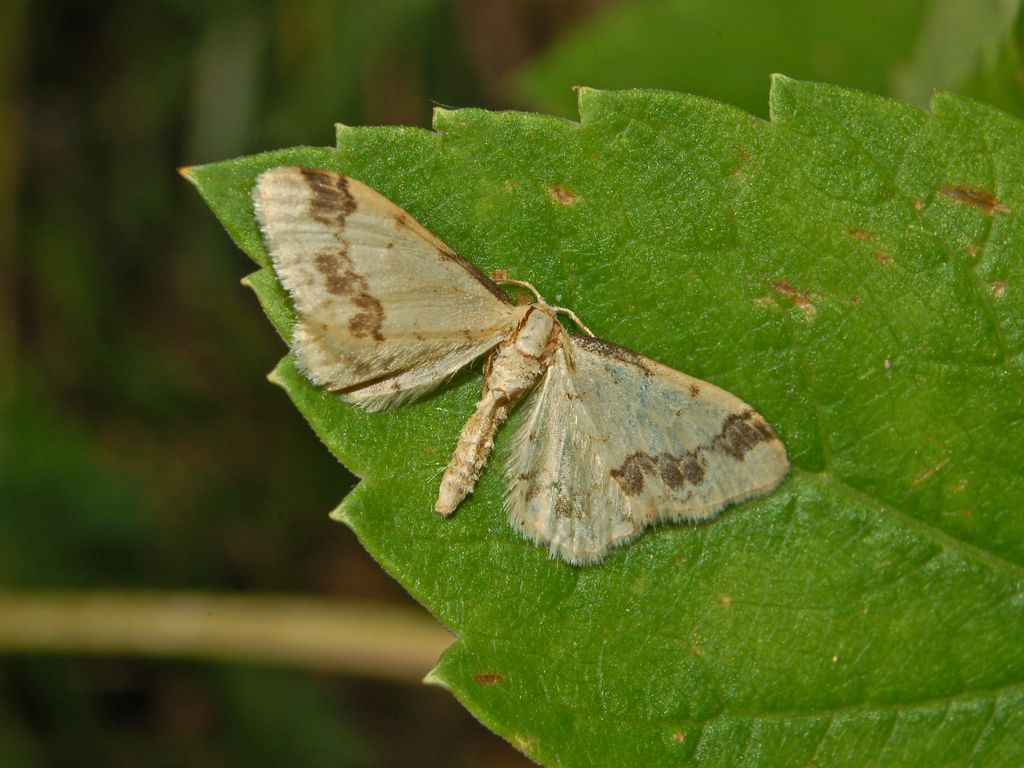

Scientific classification
- Kingdom: Animalia
- Phylum: Arthropoda
- Clade: Pancrustacea
- Class: Insecta
- Order: Lepidoptera
- Family: Geometridae
- Genus: Idaea
- Species: I. trigeminata

Binomial name
- Idaea trigeminata (Haworth, 1809)

= Idaea trigeminata =

Treble brown spot

Species of moth

Idaea trigeminata, the treble brown spot, is a moth of the family Geometridae. It is found in Europe.

The species has a wingspan of 23–25 mm. It is similar to Idaea dimidiata, but generally rather larger and somewhat paler; the front edge of the fore wings is marked with blackish or dark purplish grey, and there is a band of the same colour on the outer marginal area; the inner edge of this band is formed by the second line, and the outer edge is wavy, interrupted above the middle, and sometimes below also.The rough and rather flattened caterpillar tapers towards the head; in colour it is dusky brown. The markings comprise interrupted black lines and V-shaped blackish marks on the back. Buckler states that this caterpillar may be distinguished from those of its nearest allies by having a rather long, dingy ochreous bristle from each of the raised dots; these bristles, which are of the same thickness throughout, curve forwards on all rings to the ninth, and on the other three backwards.

== Notes ==
1. The flight season refers to the British Isles. This may vary in other parts of the range.
