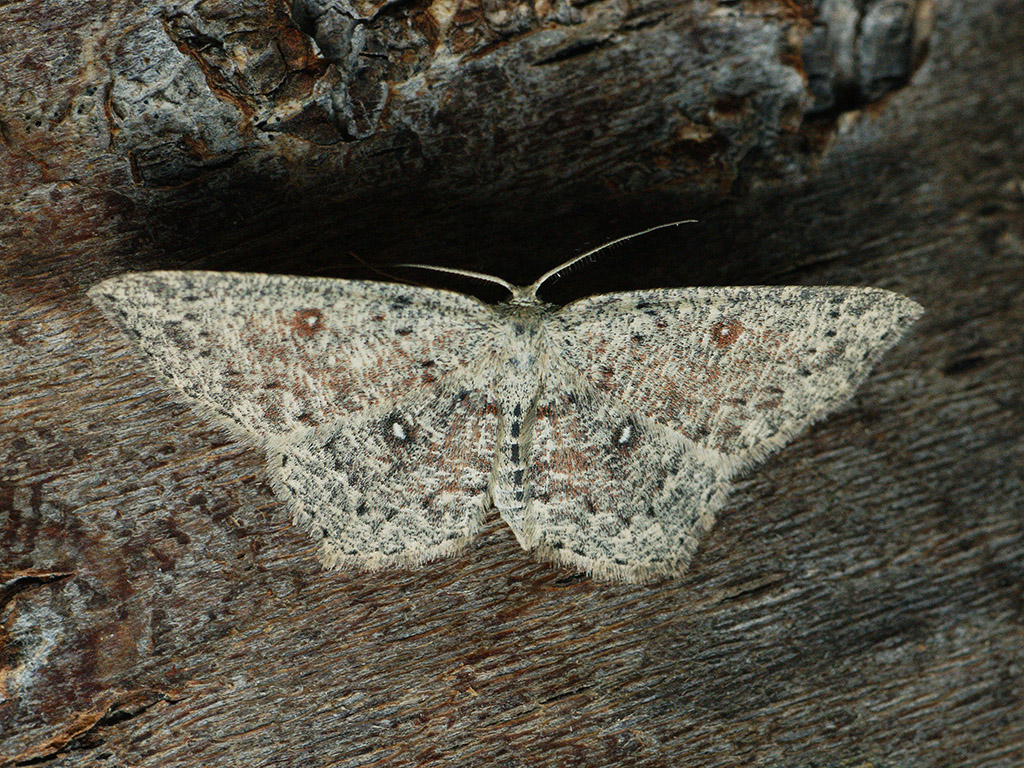
- Cyclophora pendularia Moscow oblast

Scientific classification
- Kingdom: Animalia
- Phylum: Arthropoda
- Clade: Pancrustacea
- Class: Insecta
- Order: Lepidoptera
- Family: Geometridae
- Genus: Cyclophora
- Species: C. pendularia

Binomial name
- Cyclophora pendularia (Clerck, 1759)

Synonyms
- Phalaena pendularia Clerck, 1759; Geometra orbicularia Hubner, 1799

= Cyclophora pendularia =

Species of moth

Cyclophora Pendularia, the Dingy Mocha, is a moth of the family Geometridae. The species was first described by Carl Alexander Clerck in 1759 and it can be found in the Palearctic realm.

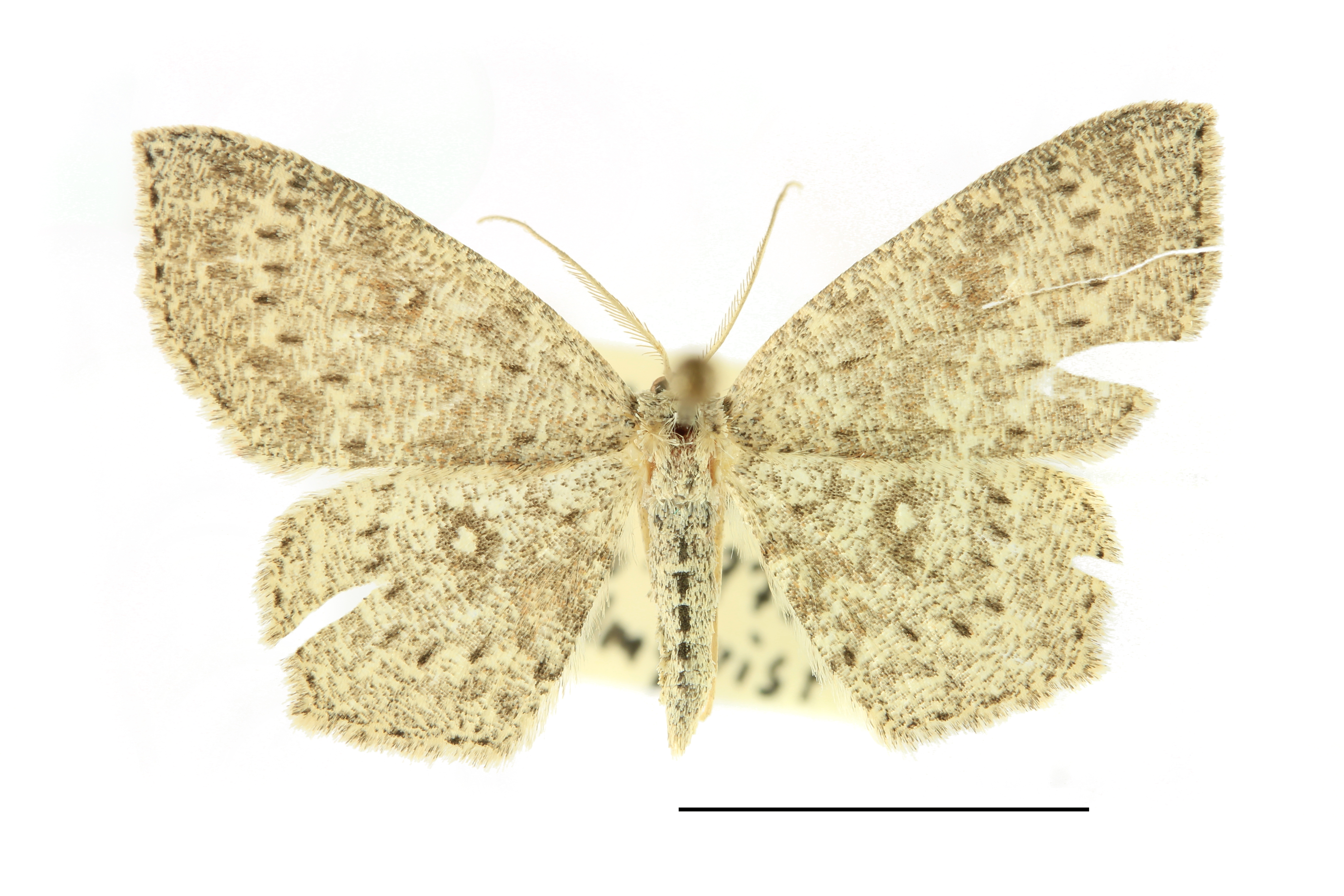

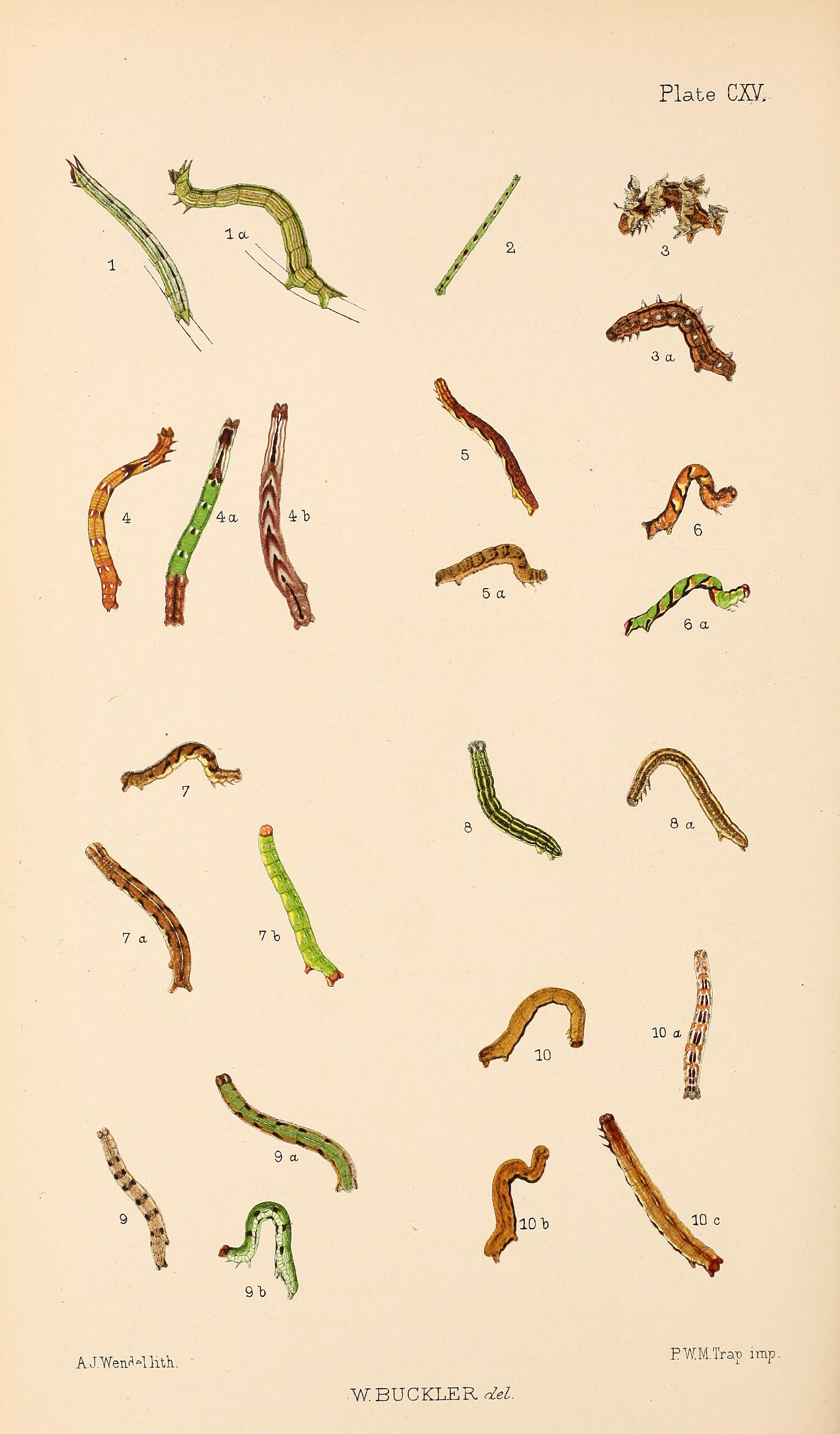
Fig 9,9a,9b Larva after final moult

The wingspan is 26–29 mm. The wings are greyish, thickly striped with darker grey; the markings similar to those of the birch mocha, but the rings are nearly always reddish or purplish, and the central line is wavy. The egg is at first bone-coloured; later, pink dots and patches appear. The caterpillar is bright green with three lines along the back, the central one edged on each side with dark green and the others wavy; the sides are blotched with pink or pale purple, or sometimes whitish and unmarked; head slightly notched on the crown, pale brown, marked with darker; fore legs tipped with pink. In another form of the green coloration, the sides are pinkish with dark-brown oblique stripes; in a third the general colour is pale brown.

The moths fly from May to August in two broods the dates depending on the location.

The larvae feed on willow.
