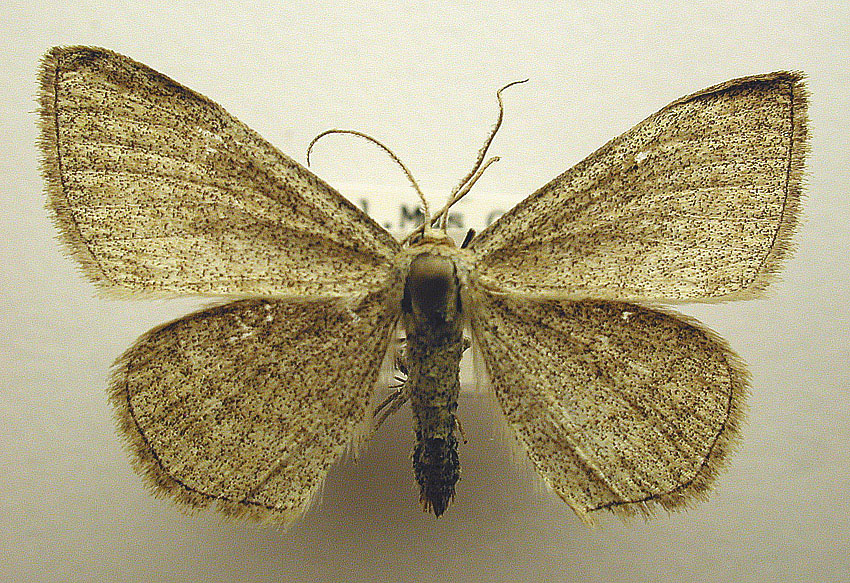

Scientific classification
- Domain: Eukaryota
- Kingdom: Animalia
- Phylum: Arthropoda
- Class: Insecta
- Order: Lepidoptera
- Family: Geometridae
- Genus: Scopula
- Species: S. virgulata

Binomial name
- Scopula virgulata (Denis & Schiffermüller, 1775)

Synonyms
- Geometra virgulata Denis & Schiffermuller, 1775; Geometra strigaria Hubner, 1799; Acidalia rossica Djakonov, 1926; Leptomeris sulcaria Hubner, 1825; Scopula virgularia; Acidalia substrigaria Staudinger, 1900

= Scopula virgulata =

Species of geometer moth in subfamily Sterrhinae

Scopula virgulata, the streaked wave, is a moth of the family Geometridae. The species was first described by Denis & Ignaz Schiffermüller in 1775. It is found from most of Europe to central Asia and northern Mongolia.

The wingspan is 20–22 millimetres (0.79–0.87 in). Adults are on wing from late July to August in one generation per year.

The larvae feed on Carex and Inula species. Larvae can be found from August to June. It overwinters in the larval stage.

== Subspecies ==
- Scopula virgulata virgulata western, central, southern and eastern Europe, except the northern Baltic region and southern Finland)
- Scopula virgulata rossica Djakonov, 1926 (northern Baltic region, southern Finland, Gotland)
- Scopula virgulata substrigaria (Staudinger, 1900) (Caucasus, western Siberia, Altai, Mongolia)
- Scopula virgulata subtilis Prout, 1935 (Russian Far East)
- Scopula virgulata albicans Prout, 1934 (Japan)
