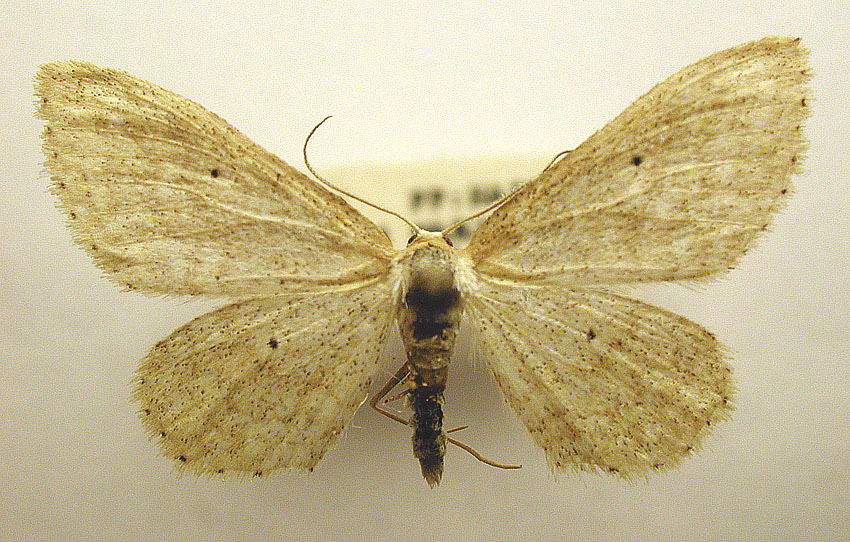

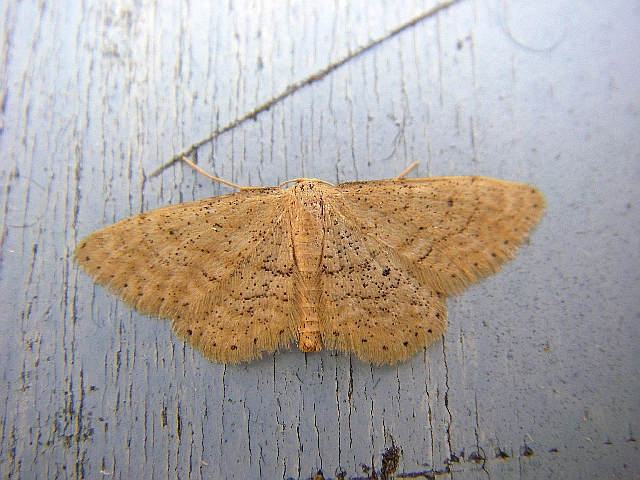

Scientific classification
- Kingdom: Animalia
- Phylum: Arthropoda
- Clade: Pancrustacea
- Class: Insecta
- Order: Lepidoptera
- Family: Geometridae
- Genus: Idaea
- Species: I. sylvestraria

Binomial name
- Idaea sylvestraria (Hübner, 1799)

= Idaea sylvestraria =

Dotted border wave

Species of moth

Idaea sylvestraria, the dotted border wave, is a moth of the family Geometridae. The species was first described by Jacob Hübner in 1799. It is found in Europe.

The species has a wingspan of 20–23 mm. The adults fly in July and August.

The larvae feed on low plants such as dandelion, knotgrass, heather, bramble, and wild thyme.

== Notes ==
1. The flight season refers to the British Isles. This may vary in other parts of the range.
