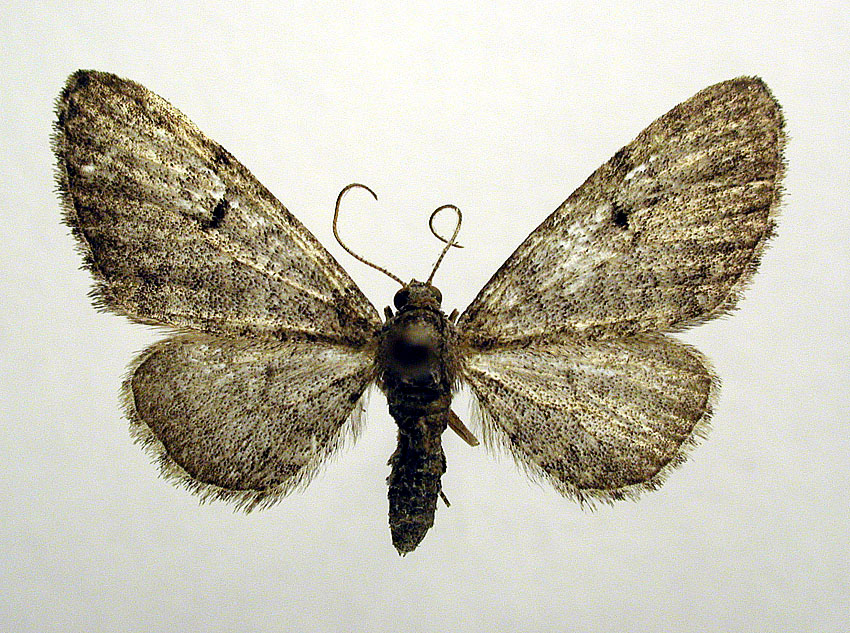

Scientific classification
- Domain: Eukaryota
- Kingdom: Animalia
- Phylum: Arthropoda
- Class: Insecta
- Order: Lepidoptera
- Family: Geometridae
- Genus: Eupithecia
- Species: E. egenaria

Binomial name
- Eupithecia egenaria Herrich-Schäffer, 1848

Synonyms
- Eupithecia undosata Dietze, 1875

= Eupithecia egenaria =

Species of moth

Eupithecia egenaria, the pauper pug, is a moth of the family Geometridae. It is known from almost all of Europe, except Portugal, Ireland and the southern part of the Balkan Peninsula.

The wingspan is 21–24 mm. There is one generation per year with adults on wing from May to June.

The larvae feed on Tilia species. Larvae can be found from June to August. It overwinters as a pupa.
