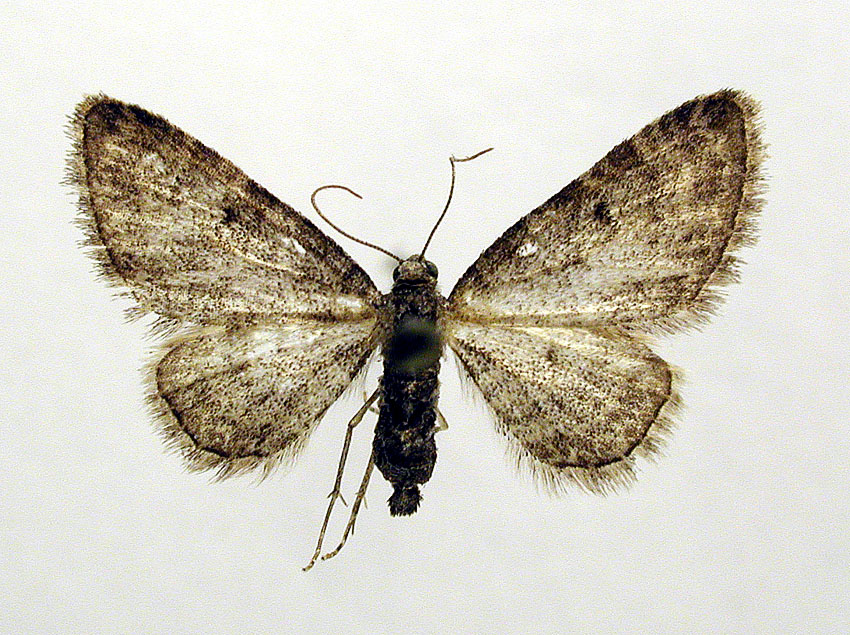

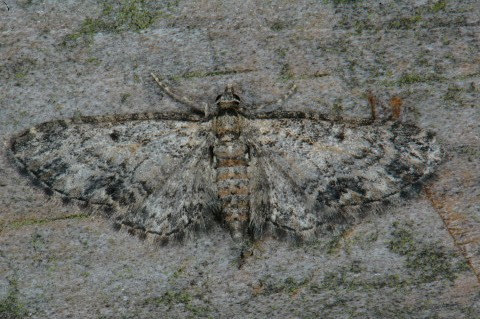

Scientific classification
- Kingdom: Animalia
- Phylum: Arthropoda
- Clade: Pancrustacea
- Class: Insecta
- Order: Lepidoptera
- Family: Geometridae
- Genus: Eupithecia
- Species: E. inturbata

Binomial name
- Eupithecia inturbata (Hübner, 1817)

Synonyms
- Geometra inturbata Hubner, 1817; Eupithecia neglectata Herrich-Schaffer, 1848; Eupithecia subciliata Doubleday, 1856

= Eupithecia inturbata =

Species of moth

Eupithecia inturbata, the maple pug, is a moth of the family Geometridae. The species can be found in central Europe, Great Britain and southern Scandinavia.

The wingspan is 13–15 mm. The moth flies from July to August depending on the location.

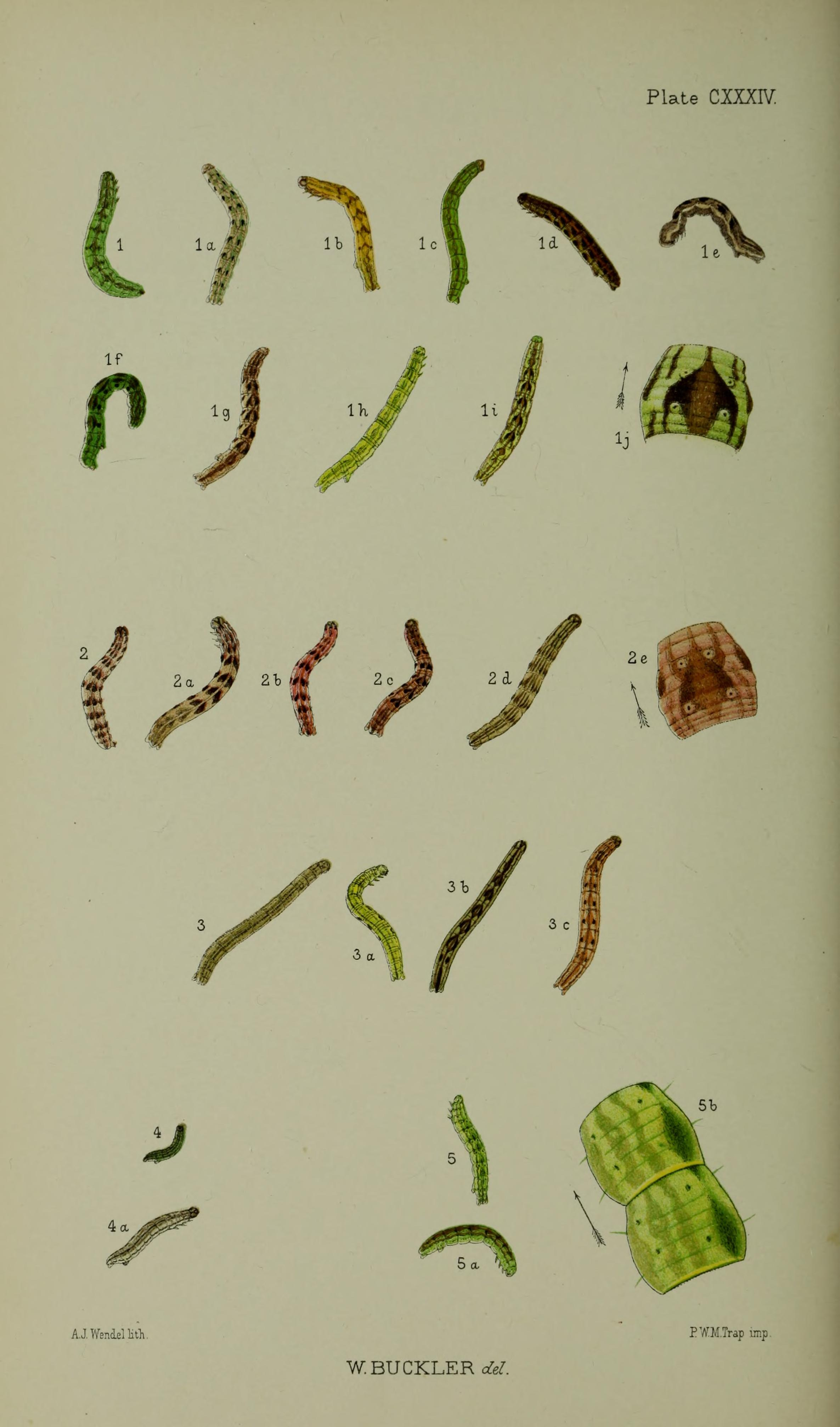
Figs 5,5a larvae after final moult 5b enlarged detail of segments

The caterpillars feed on Acer campestris.
