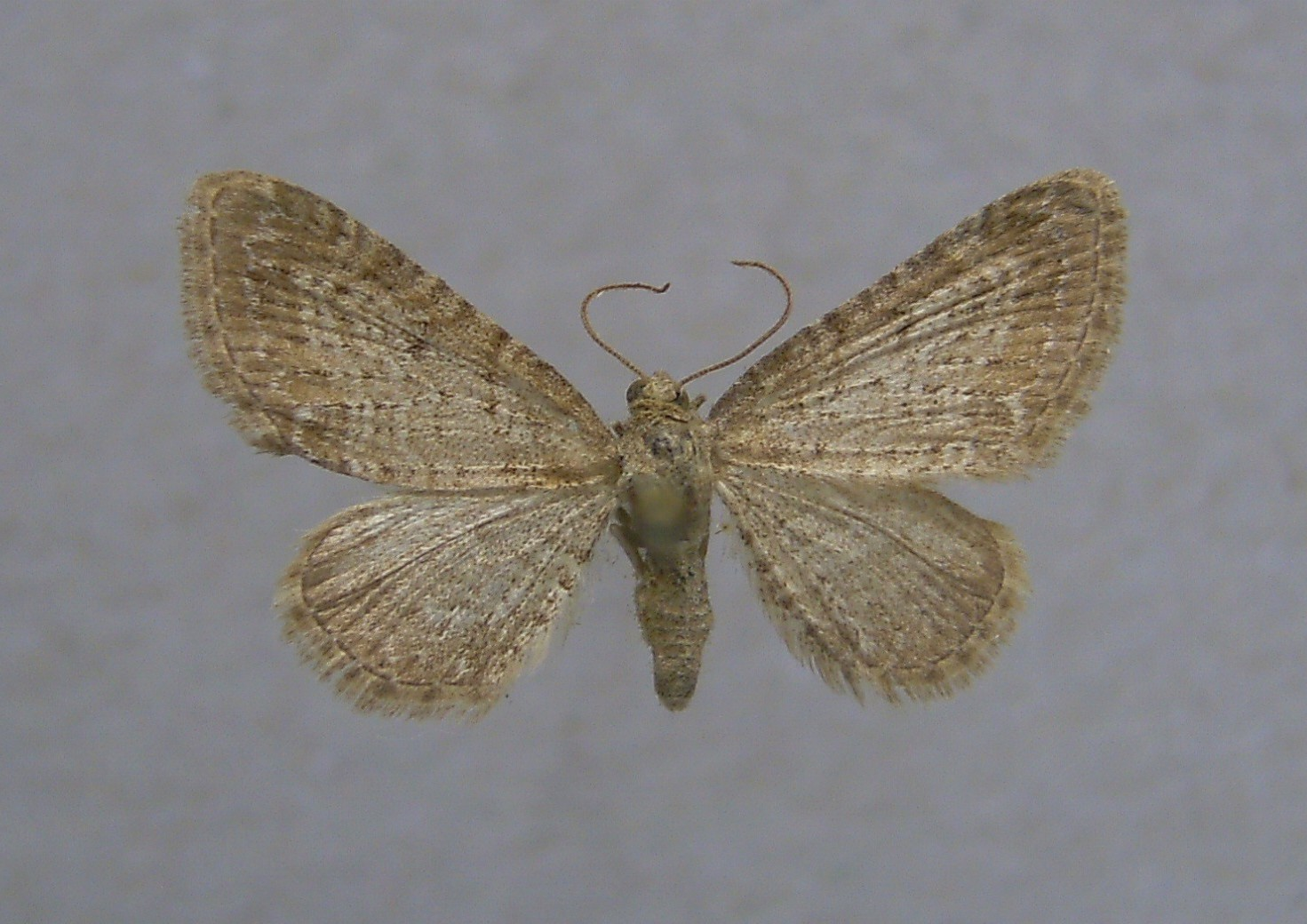

Scientific classification
- Domain: Eukaryota
- Kingdom: Animalia
- Phylum: Arthropoda
- Class: Insecta
- Order: Lepidoptera
- Family: Geometridae
- Genus: Eupithecia
- Species: E. cauchiata

Binomial name
- Eupithecia cauchiata (Duponchel, 1831)

Synonyms
- Larentia cauchiata Duponchel, 1831; Eupithecia griseimarginata La Harpe, 1853; Eupithecia majoraria La Harpe, 1855; Eupithecia robertata Rougemont, 1903

= Eupithecia cauchiata =

Species of moth

Eupithecia cauchiata is a moth of the family Geometridae. It is found from the Pyrenees to the Ural. In the north, the range extends to the southern coast of Finland.

The wingspan is 18–22 mm. Adults are on wing from mid May to the end of July.

The larvae feed on the leaves of Solidago virgaurea and can be found from July to September. The species overwinters in the pupal stage, sometimes they overwinter twice.

== Habitat ==
This specie can be found in the following surroundings:

- Forest clearings
- Glades
- Sunny deciduous forests
- Sunny mixed forests
