= List of moths of Great Britain (Sesiidae) =

The family Sesiidae has 15 representatives in Great Britain, one of which is of uncertain status:

== Subfamily Sesiinae ==
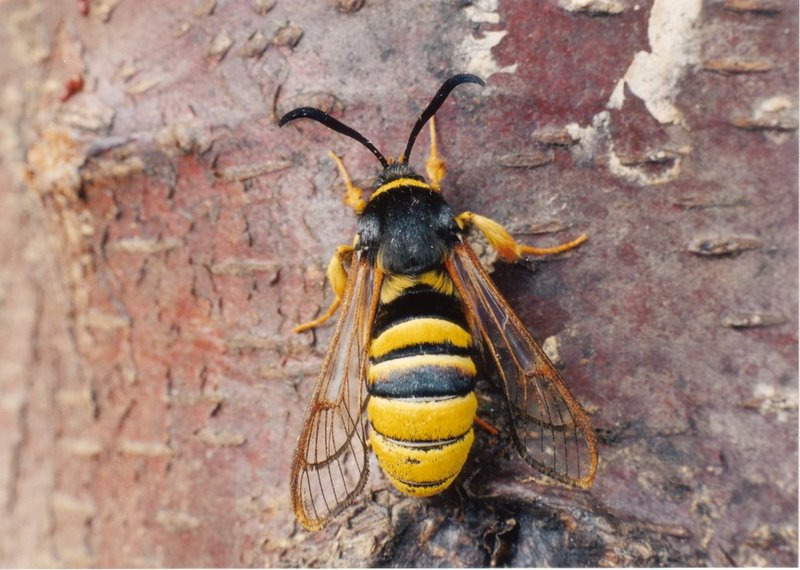
Lunar hornet moth

- Sesia apiformis, hornet moth — east, south (Nationally Scarce B)
- Sesia bembeciformis, lunar hornet moth — throughout

== Subfamily Paranthreninae ==
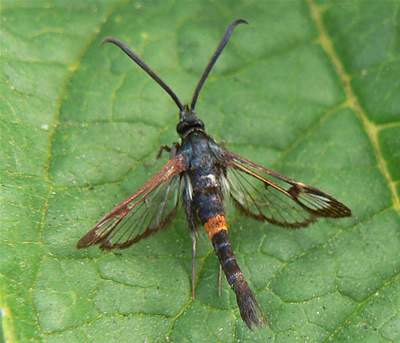
Red-belted clearwing

- Paranthrene tabaniformis, dusky clearwing — south (presumed extinct)
- Synanthedon tipuliformis, currant clearwing — throughout England, local Wales, Scotland & Isle of Man (Nationally Scarce B)
- Synanthedon vespiformis, yellow-legged clearwing — south, central (Nationally Scarce B)
- Synanthedon spheciformis, white-barred clearwing — south, central (not south-west) (Nationally Scarce B)
- Synanthedon scoliaeformis, Welsh clearwing — Wales & Scotland (Red Data Book)
- Synanthedon flaviventris, sallow clearwing — south (Nationally Scarce B)
- Synanthedon andrenaeformis, orange-tailed clearwing — south (Nationally Scarce B)
- Synanthedon myopaeformis, red-belted clearwing — south (Nationally Scarce B)
- Synanthedon formicaeformis, red-tipped clearwing — England, Glamorgan, Dumfries and Galloway (Nationally Scarce B)
- Synanthedon culiciformis, large red-belted clearwing — throughout (Nationally Scarce B)
- Bembecia ichneumoniformis, six-belted clearwing — south, central (Nationally Scarce B)
- Synansphecia muscaeformis, thrift clearwing — south-west, north-east (Nationally Scarce B)
- Pyropteron chrysidiformis, fiery clearwing — south-east (Red Data Book) ‡

Species listed in the 2007 UK Biodiversity Action Plan (BAP) are indicated by a double-dagger symbol (‡)—species so listed for research purposes only are also indicated with an asterisk (‡*).

== See also ==
- List of moths of Great Britain (overview)
  - Family lists: Hepialidae, Cossidae, Zygaenidae, Limacodidae, Sesiidae, Lasiocampidae, Saturniidae, Endromidae, Drepanidae, Thyatiridae, Geometridae, Sphingidae, Notodontidae, Thaumetopoeidae, Lymantriidae, Arctiidae, Ctenuchidae, Nolidae, Noctuidae and Micromoths
