= List of moths of Great Britain (Lasiocampidae) =

The family Lasiocampidae comprises the eggar moths, of which 10 are resident species in Great Britain, one probably extinct and one probably an immigrant:

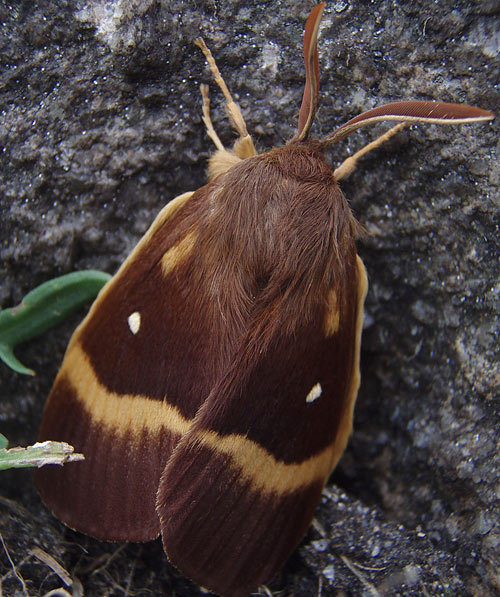
Oak eggar

- Poecilocampa populi, December moth — throughout
- Trichiura crataegi, pale eggar — throughout (vulnerable) ‡*
- Eriogaster lanestris, small eggar — south, central (Nationally Scarce B)

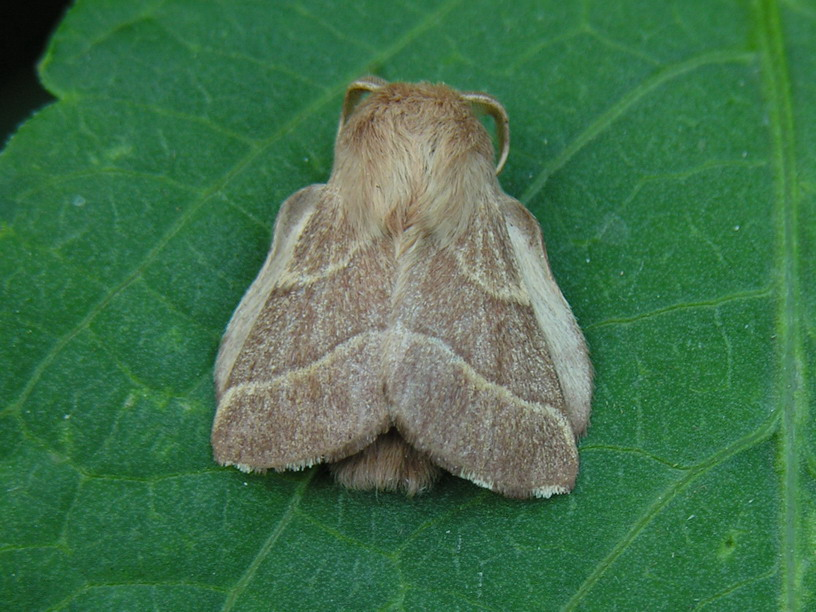
Lackey

- Malacosoma neustria, lackey — south, central (common) and north (scattered) (Vulnerable) ‡*
- Malacosoma castrensis, ground lackey — south-east, south-west (Nationally Scarce A)
- Lasiocampa trifolii, grass eggar — south, west-central (Nationally Scarce A)

- Lasiocampa trifolii f. flava (pale grass eggar) — south-east (Red Data Book)

- Lasiocampa quercus, oak eggar

- Lasiocampa quercus quercus — south, central
- Lasiocampa quercus f. callunae (northern eggar) — north, west

- Macrothylacia rubi, fox moth — throughout
- Dendrolimus pini, pine-tree lappet — rare immigrant
- Euthrix potatoria, drinker — south, central, north-west
- Phyllodesma ilicifolia, small lappet — presumed extinct

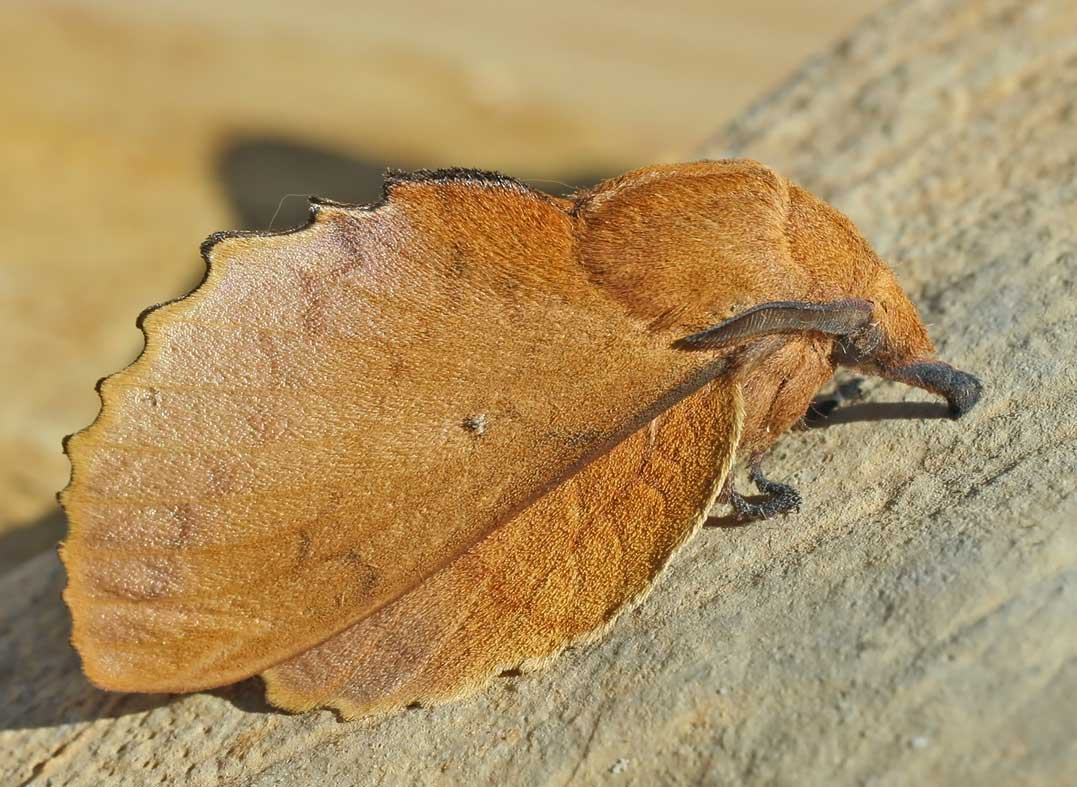
Lappet

- Gastropacha quercifolia, lappet — south, east-central

Species listed in the 2007 UK Biodiversity Action Plan (BAP) are indicated by a double-dagger symbol (‡)—species so listed for research purposes only are also indicated with an asterisk (‡*).

== See also ==
- List of moths of Great Britain (overview)
  - Family lists: Hepialidae, Cossidae, Zygaenidae, Limacodidae, Sesiidae, Lasiocampidae, Saturniidae, Endromidae, Drepanidae, Thyatiridae, Geometridae, Sphingidae, Notodontidae, Thaumetopoeidae, Lymantriidae, Arctiidae, Ctenuchidae, Nolidae, Noctuidae and Micromoths
