= List of moths of Great Britain (Notodontidae) =

The family Notodontidae comprises the "prominent and kitten moths", of which 27 have been recorded in Great Britain:

== Subfamily Notodontinae ==
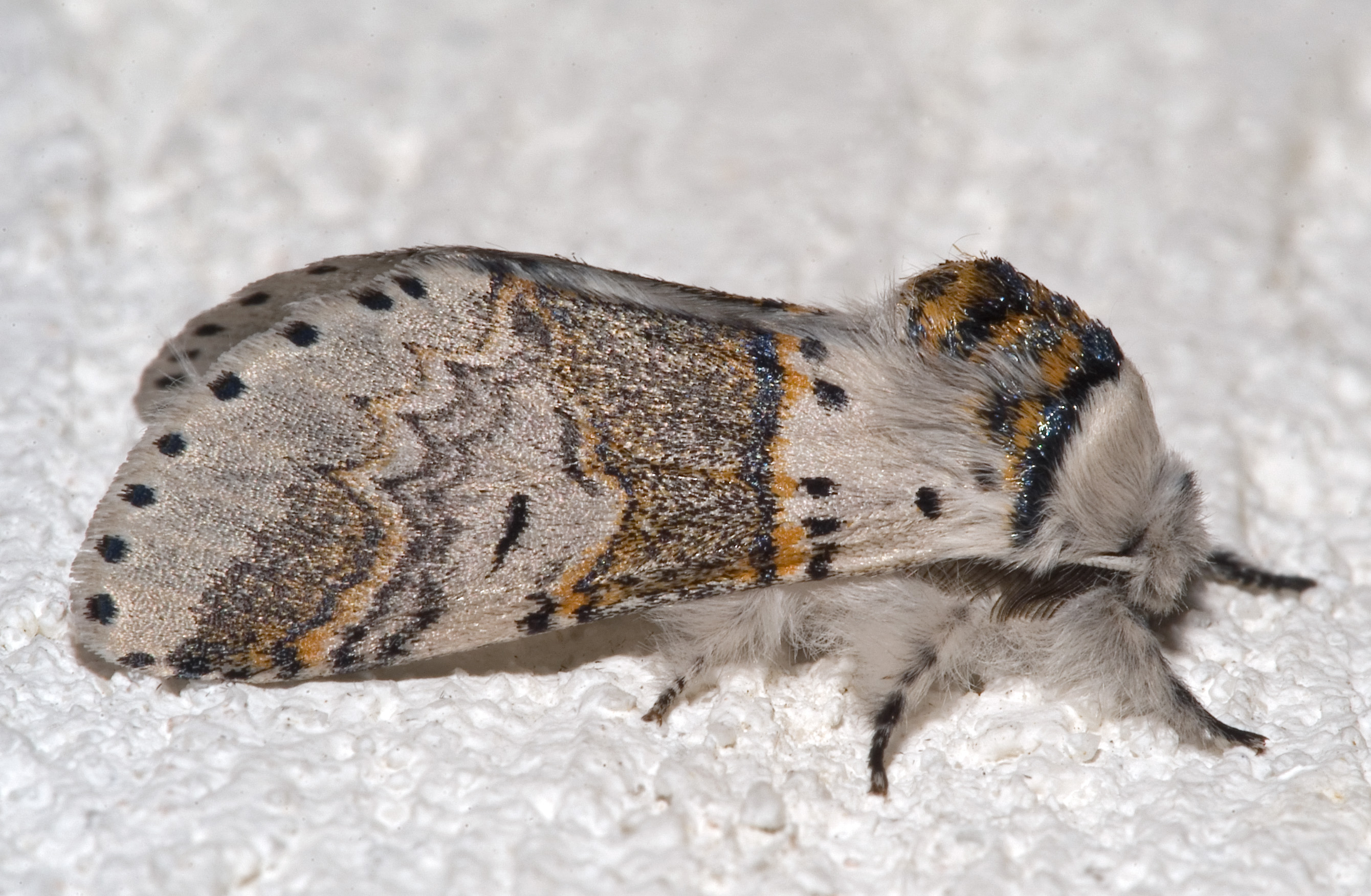
Sallow kitten (male)

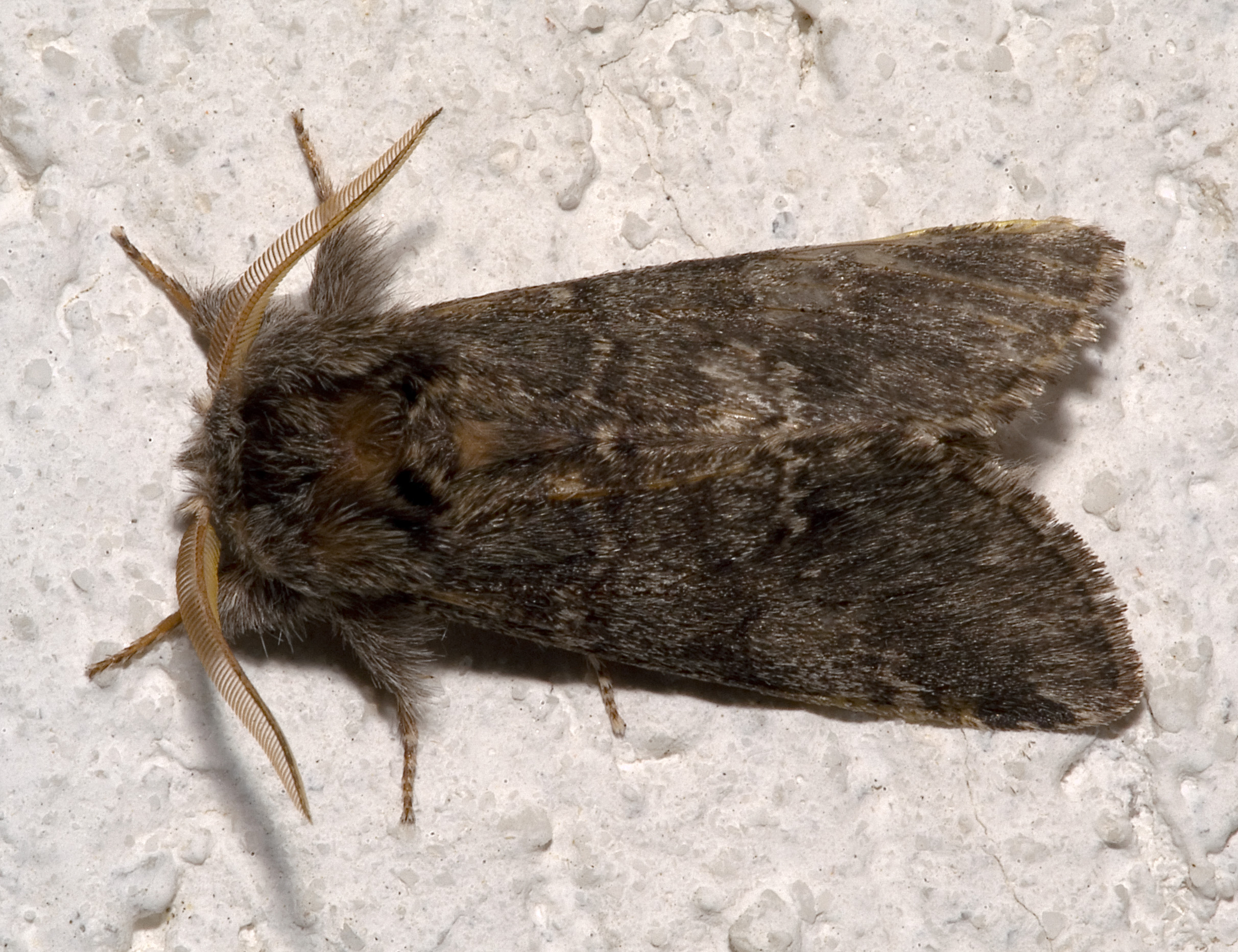
Lunar marbled brown

- Cerura vinula, puss moth — throughout
- Furcula bicuspis, alder kitten — south-west, south-east, east and west-central (localized)
- Furcula furcula, sallow kitten — throughout
- Furcula bifida, poplar kitten — south and central (localized)
- Notodonta dromedarius, iron prominent — throughout
- Notodonta torva, large dark prominent — rare immigrant
- Notodonta tritophus, three-humped prominent — immigrant
- Notodonta ziczac, pebble prominent — throughout
- Pheosia gnoma, lesser swallow prominent — throughout
- Pheosia tremula, swallow prominent — throughout
- Ptilodon capucina, coxcomb prominent — throughout
- Ptilodon cucullina, maple prominent — south and east (localized)
- Odontosia carmelita, scarce prominent — south and north (localized)
- Pterostoma palpina, pale prominent — throughout
- Leucodonta bicoloria, white prominent — extinct as resident species; possible immigrant
- Ptilophora plumigera, plumed prominent — south-east (Nationally Scarce A)
- Drymonia dodonaea, marbled brown — south, central and north-west (localized)
- Drymonia ruficornis, lunar marbled brown — throughout
- Gluphisia crenata vertunea, dusky marbled brown — rare immigrant

== Subfamily Pygaerinae ==
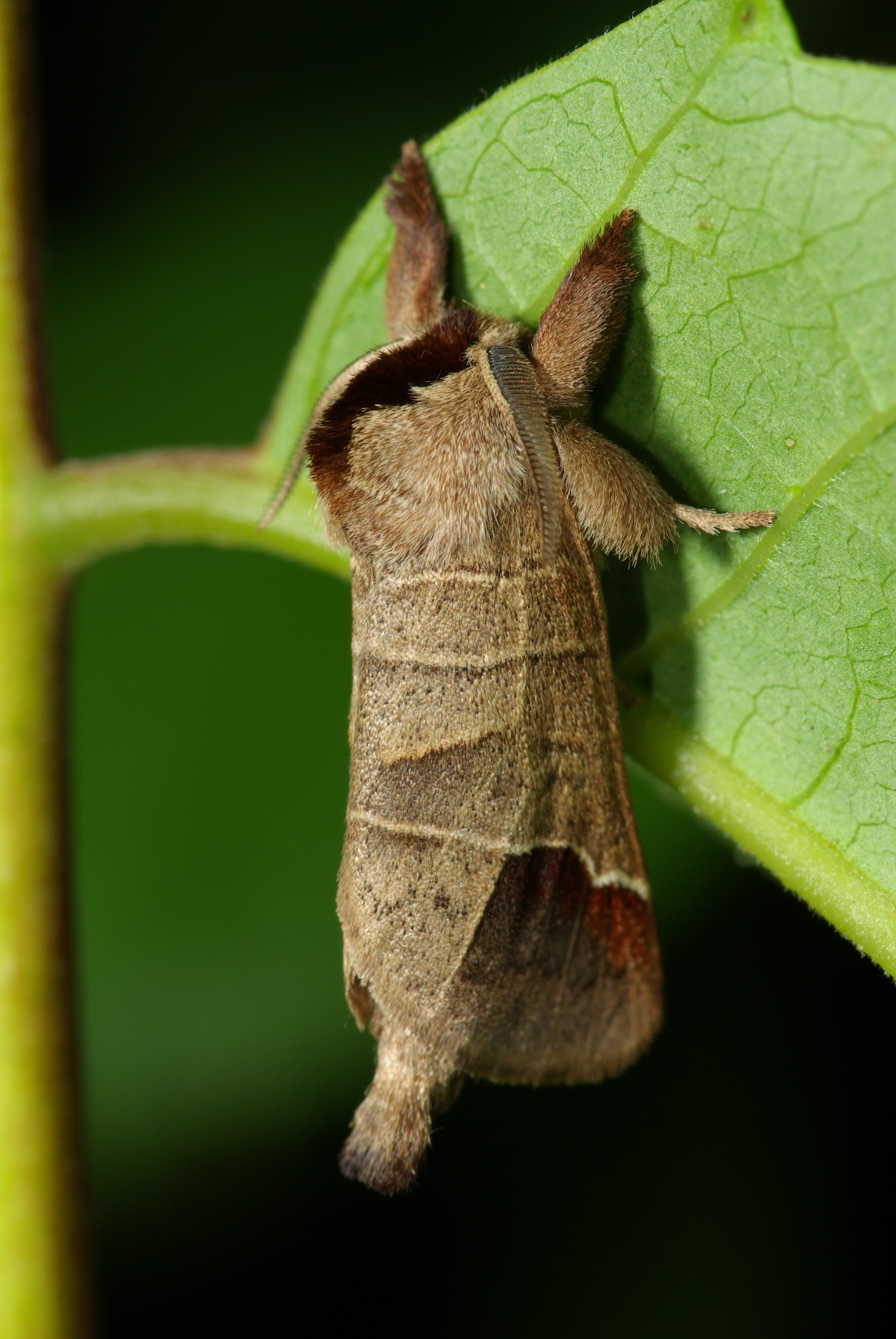
Chocolate-tip

- Clostera pigra, small chocolate-tip — throughout (Nationally Scarce B)
- Clostera anachoreta, scarce chocolate-tip — south-east (Red Data Book)
- Clostera curtula, chocolate-tip — throughout southern England, locally distributed in north

== Subfamily Phalerinae ==
- Phalera bucephala, buff-tip — throughout

== Subfamily Heterocampinae ==
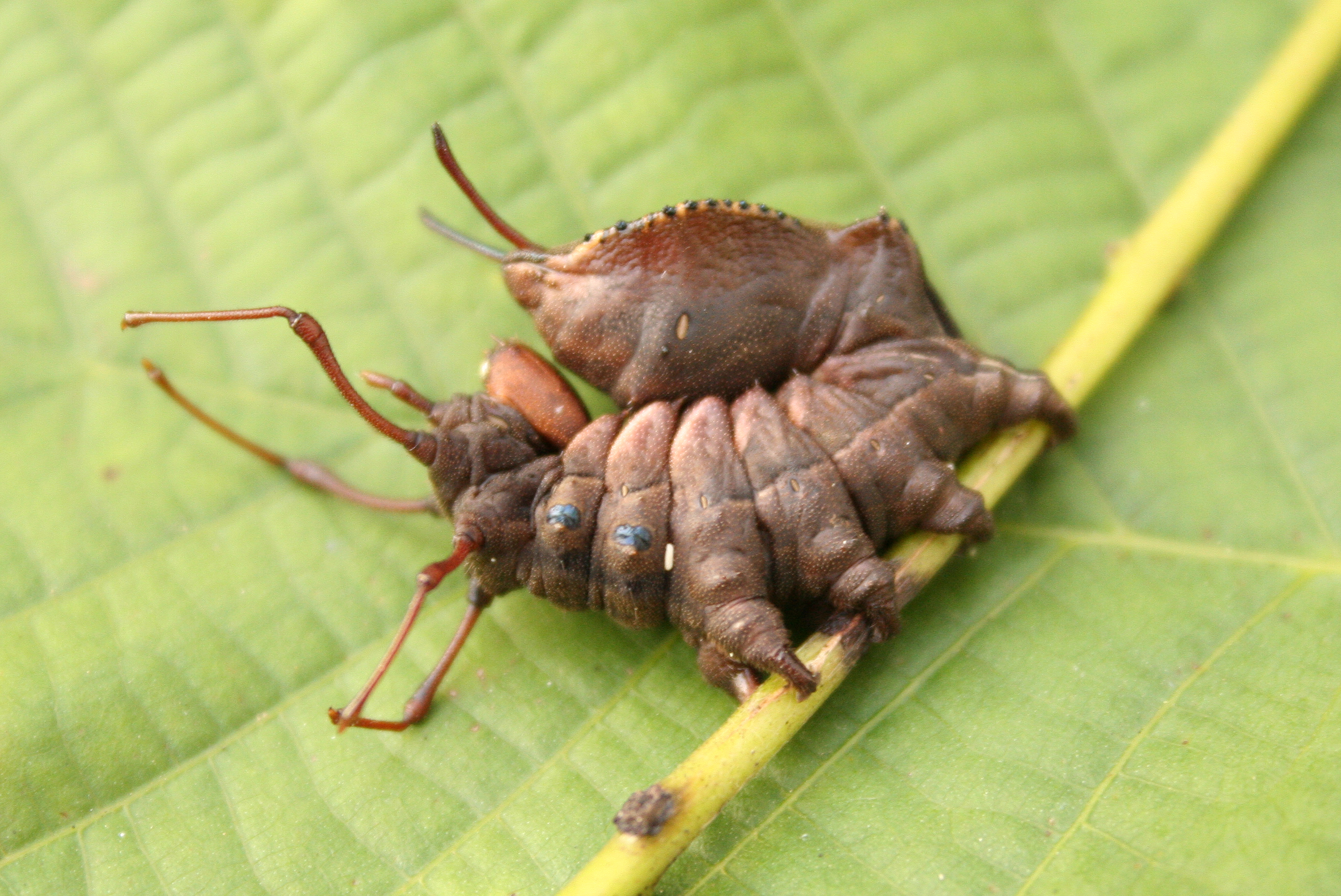
The lobster moth is named after the caterpillar rather than the adult moth.

- Stauropus fagi, lobster moth — south and west-central
- Harpyia milhauseri, tawny prominent — rare immigrant
- Peridea anceps, great prominent — south, west-central and north-west (localized)

== Subfamily Dilobinae ==
- Diloba caeruleocephala, figure of eight — south, centre and north ‡*

Species listed in the 2007 UK Biodiversity Action Plan (BAP) are indicated by a double-dagger symbol (‡)—species so listed for research purposes only are also indicated with an asterisk (‡*).

== See also ==
- List of moths of Great Britain (overview)
  - Family lists: Hepialidae, Cossidae, Zygaenidae, Limacodidae, Sesiidae, Lasiocampidae, Saturniidae, Endromidae, Drepanidae, Thyatiridae, Geometridae, Sphingidae, Notodontidae, Thaumetopoeidae, Lymantriidae, Arctiidae, Ctenuchidae, Nolidae, Noctuidae and Micromoths
