= List of moths of Great Britain (Saturniidae) =

The family Saturniidae comprises about 1300 species, of which just one occurs naturally in Great Britain, and one most likely brought across English Channel inadvertently by human agency:

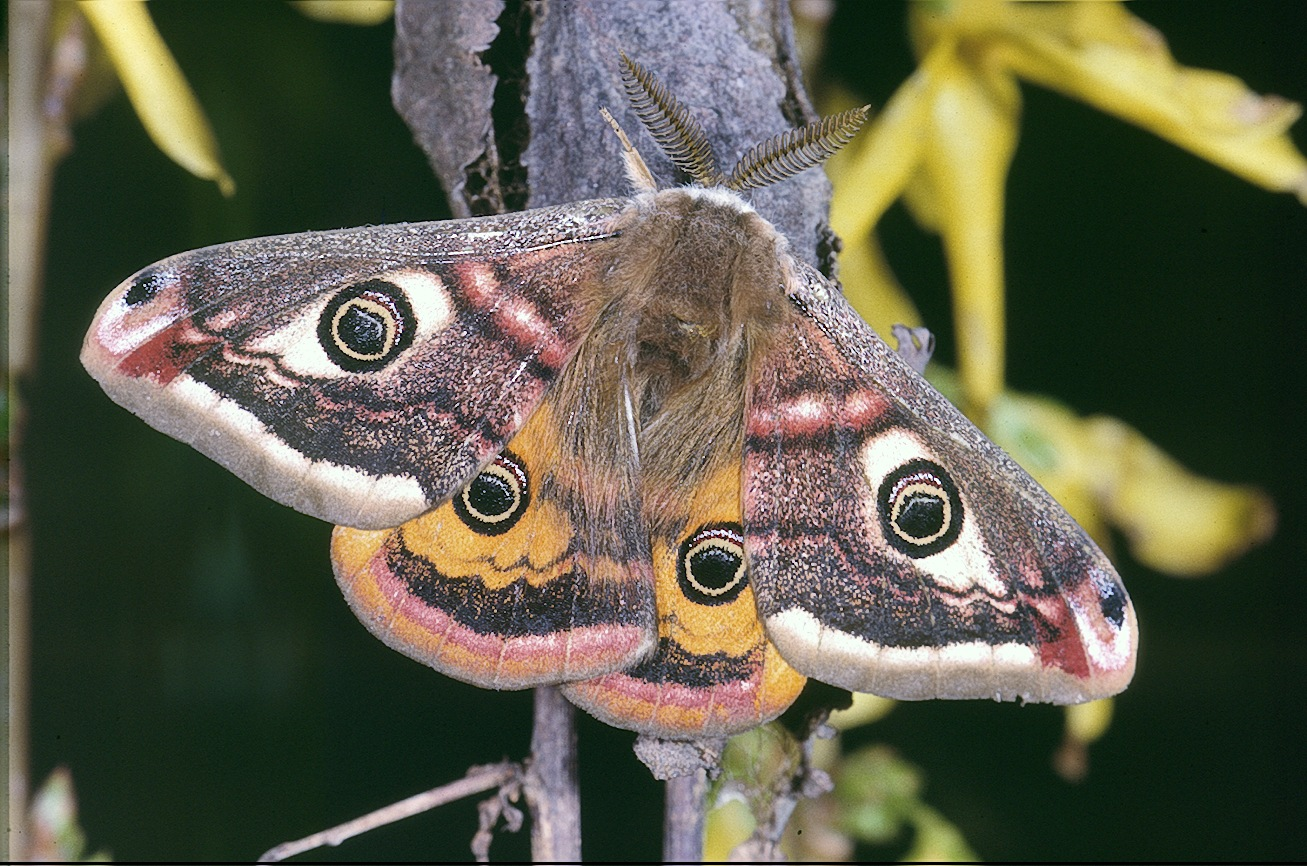
Emperor moth (male)

- Saturnia pavonia, emperor moth — throughout
- Saturnia pyri, great peacock moth — possible immigrant (otherwise accidental import)

== See also ==
- List of moths of Great Britain (overview)
  - Family lists: Hepialidae, Cossidae, Zygaenidae, Limacodidae, Sesiidae, Lasiocampidae, Saturniidae, Endromidae, Drepanidae, Thyatiridae, Geometridae, Sphingidae, Notodontidae, Thaumetopoeidae, Lymantriidae, Arctiidae, Ctenuchidae, Nolidae, Noctuidae and Micromoths
