= List of moths of Great Britain (Ctenuchidae) =

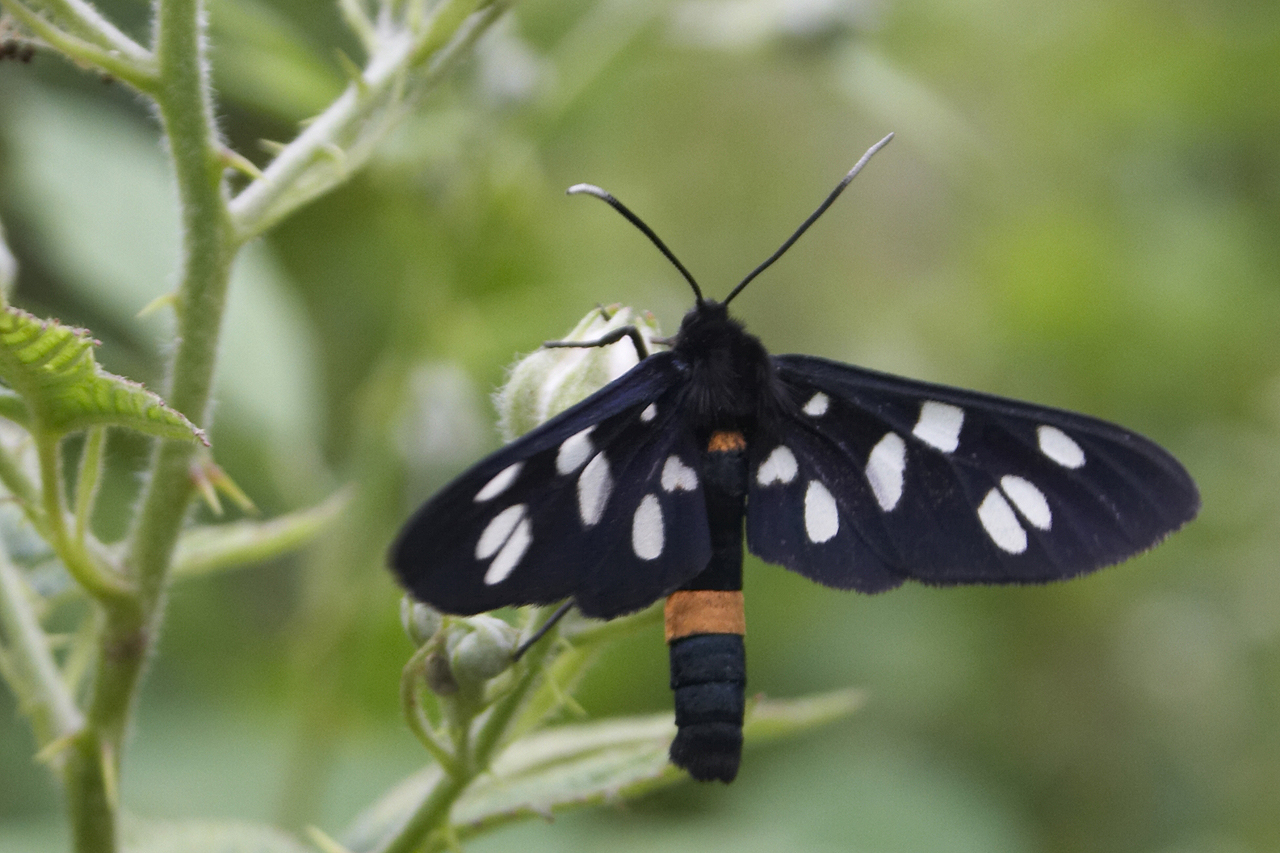
Nine-spotted

The family Ctenuchidae contains about 3000 known species, most of which are tropical. Two species may have reached Great Britain unaided, but others are accidental imports with food produce:

== Subfamily Syntominae ==
- Syntomis phegea, nine-spotted — probably rare immigrant
- Dysauxes ancilla, handmaid — possible rare immigrant from Central & Eastern Europe (one old record)

== Subfamily Euchromiinae ==
- [Euchromia lethe, basker — imported with West Indian bananas]
- [Antichloris viridis — imported with West Indian bananas]
- [Antichloris caca, docker — imported from South America]
- [Antichloris eriphia, banana stowaway — imported from South America]

== See also ==
- List of moths of Great Britain (overview)
  - Family lists: Hepialidae, Cossidae, Zygaenidae, Limacodidae, Sesiidae, Lasiocampidae, Saturniidae, Endromidae, Drepanidae, Thyatiridae, Geometridae, Sphingidae, Notodontidae, Thaumetopoeidae, Lymantriidae, Arctiidae, Ctenuchidae, Nolidae, Noctuidae and Micromoths
