= List of moths of Great Britain (Drepanidae) =

The family Drepanidae contains about 400 species, of which only eight occur in Europe. Six of these are resident in Great Britain and one is an occasional immigrant:

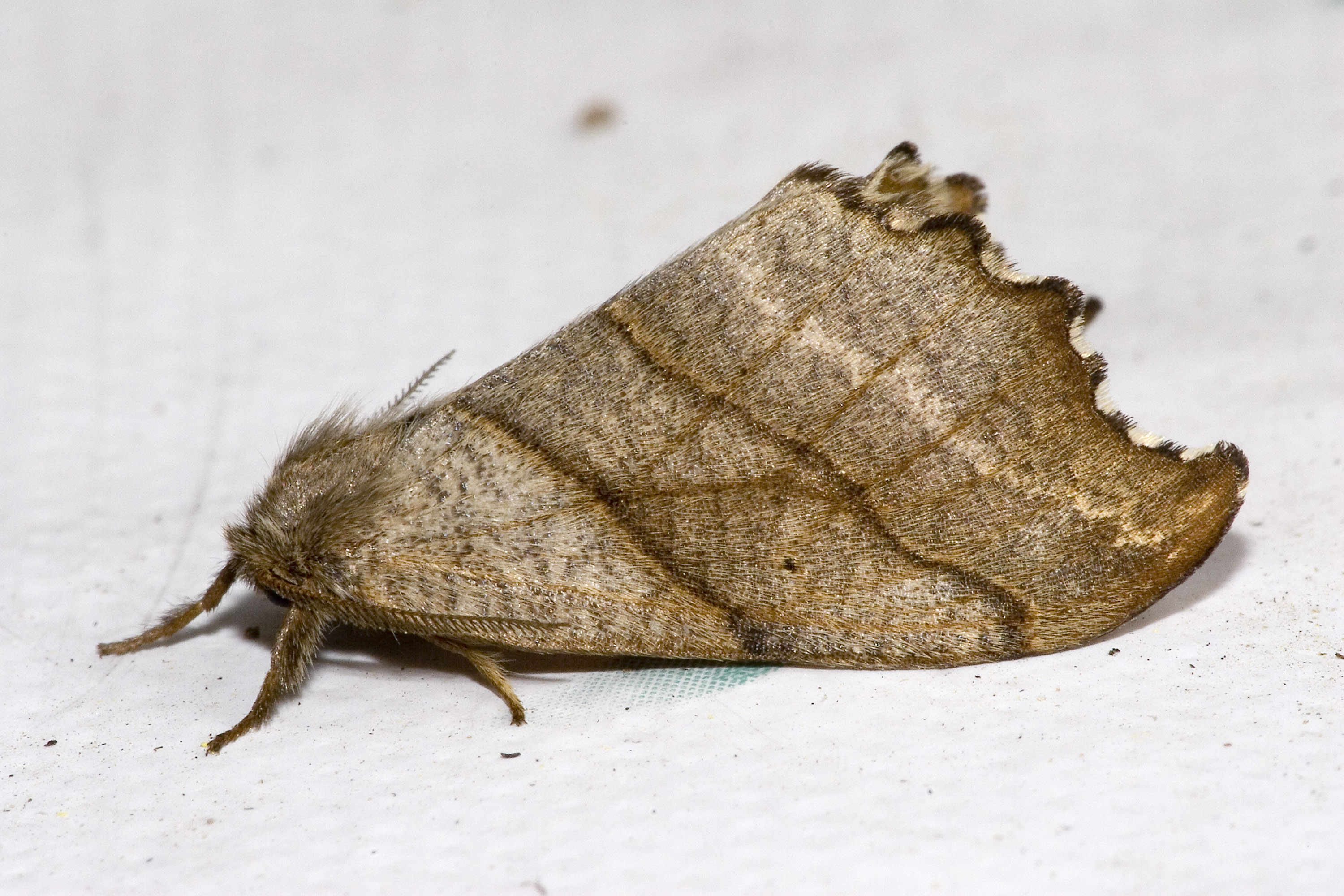
Scalloped hook-tip

- Falcaria lacertinaria, scalloped hook-tip — throughout
- Watsonalla binaria, oak hook-tip — south, central (Vulnerable) ‡*
- Watsonalla cultraria, barred hook-tip — south, central (local)

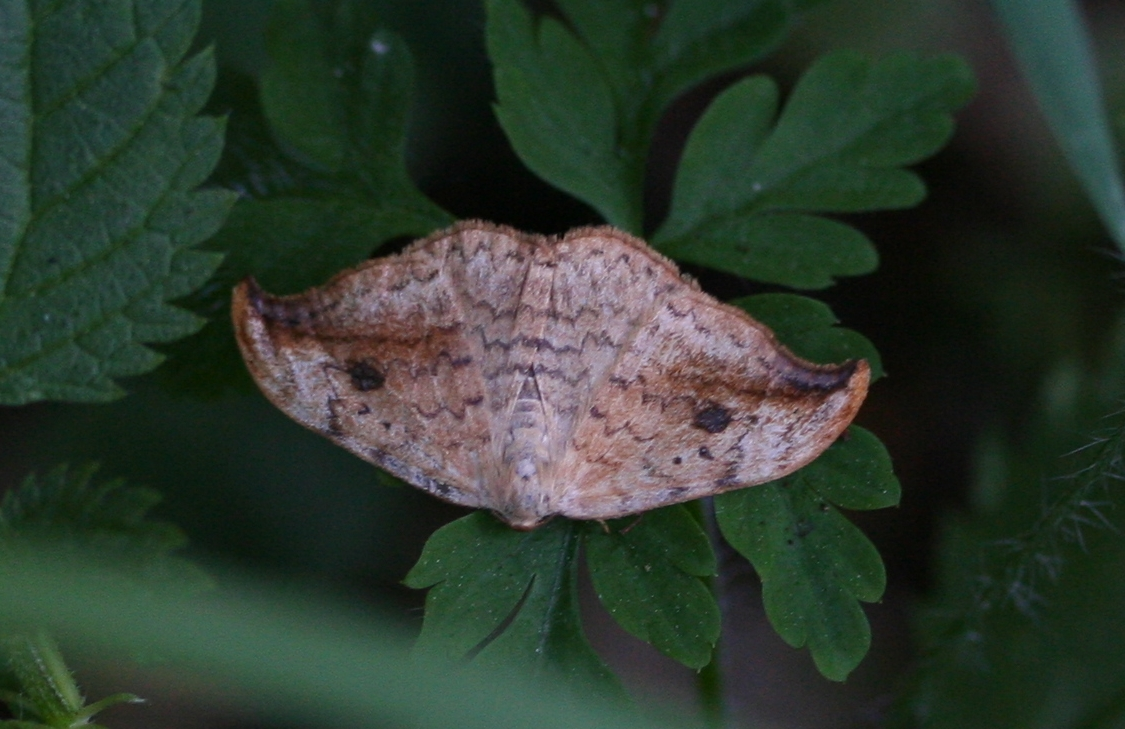
Pebble hook-tip

- Drepana falcataria, pebble hook-tip

- Drepana falcataria falcataria — south, centre
- Drepana falcataria scotica — northern Scotland (local)

- Drepana curvatula, dusky hook-tip — south, east (immigrant)
- Sabra harpagula, scarce hook-tip — south-west (Red Data Book)
- Cilix glaucata, Chinese character — south and centre (common), local in Scotland

Species listed in the 2007 UK Biodiversity Action Plan (BAP) are indicated by a double-dagger symbol (‡)—species so listed for research purposes only are also indicated with an asterisk (‡*).

== See also ==
- List of moths of Great Britain (overview)
  - Family lists: Hepialidae, Cossidae, Zygaenidae, Limacodidae, Sesiidae, Lasiocampidae, Saturniidae, Endromidae, Drepanidae, Thyatiridae, Geometridae, Sphingidae, Notodontidae, Thaumetopoeidae, Lymantriidae, Arctiidae, Ctenuchidae, Nolidae, Noctuidae and Micromoths
