= List of moths of Great Britain (Thaumetopoeidae) =

The family Thaumetopoeidae—the "processionary moths"—comprises about 100 species, of which three have been recorded in Great Britain:

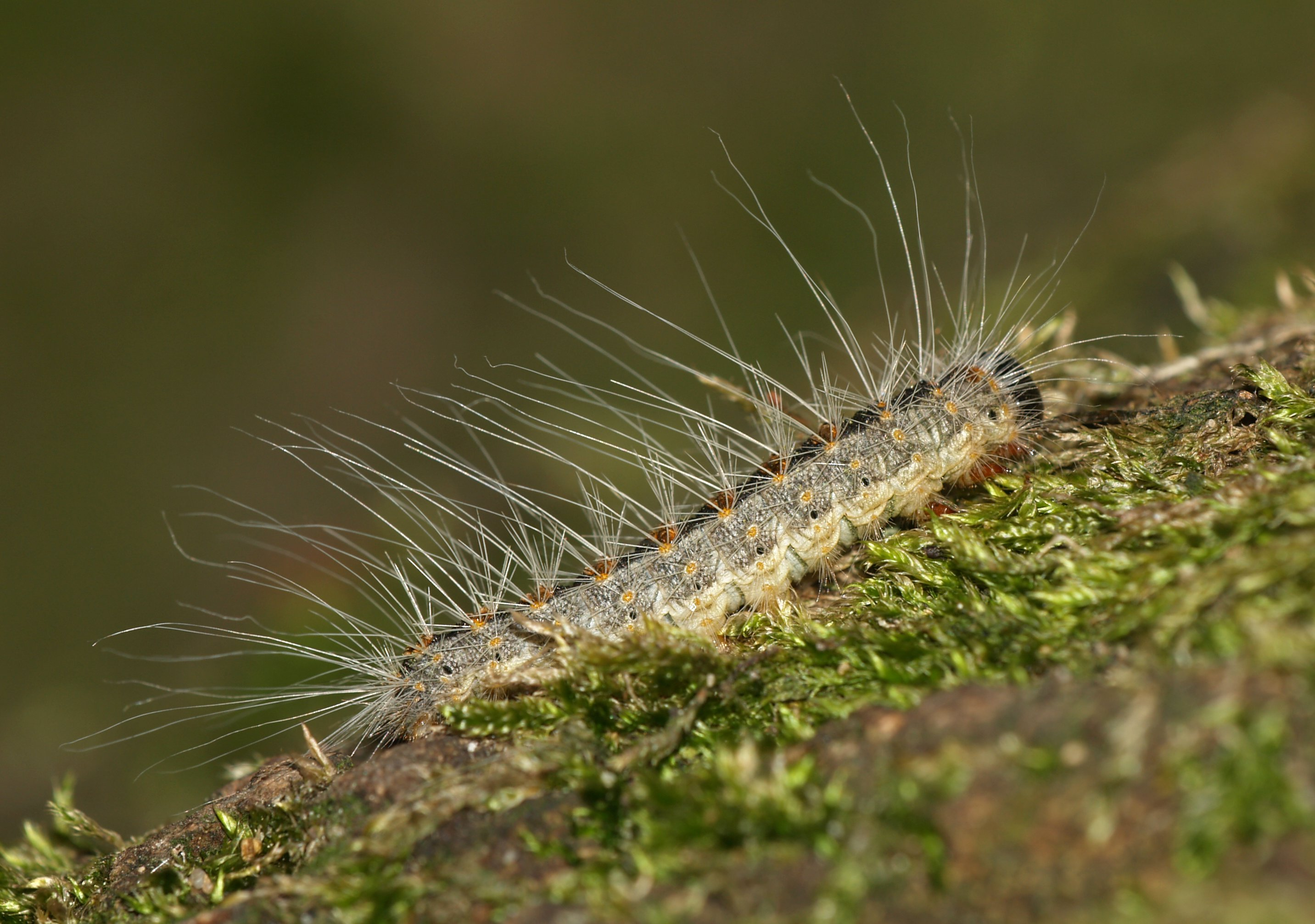
Oak processionary caterpillar

- Thaumetopoea pityocampa, pine processionary — probably rare immigrant (otherwise imported)
- Thaumetopoea processionea, oak processionary — immigrant
- [Trichocercus sparshalli, local long-tailed satin — probably imported (Australian species)]

== See also ==
- List of moths of Great Britain (overview)
  - Family lists: Hepialidae, Cossidae, Zygaenidae, Limacodidae, Sesiidae, Lasiocampidae, Saturniidae, Endromidae, Drepanidae, Thyatiridae, Geometridae, Sphingidae, Notodontidae, Thaumetopoeidae, Lymantriidae, Arctiidae, Ctenuchidae, Nolidae, Noctuidae and Micromoths
