= List of moths of Great Britain (Arctiinae) =

The subfamily Arctiinae—the tiger moths, ermines, "footmen" and related species—is represented by 32 species in Great Britain:

== Tribe Lithosiini ==
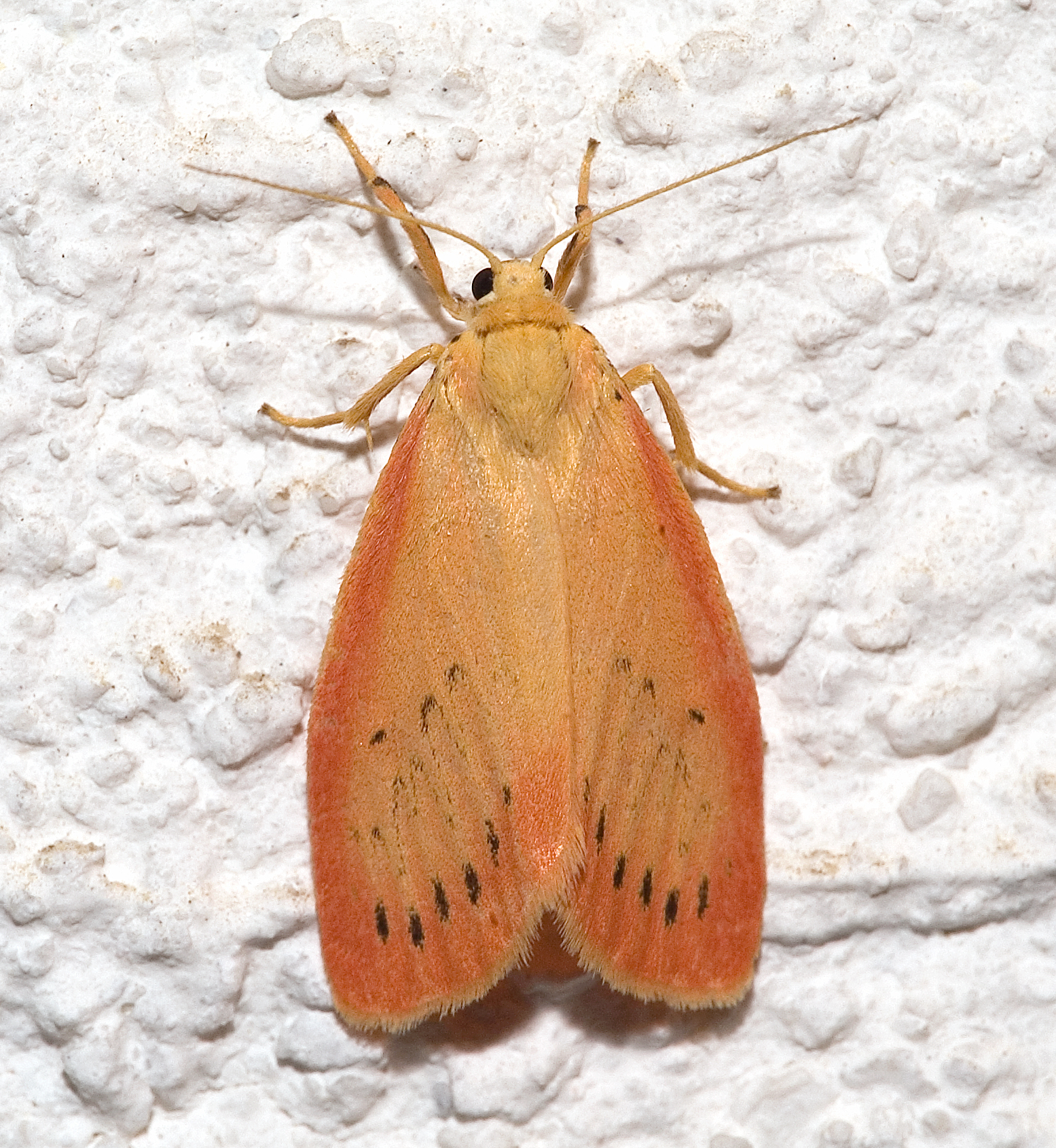
Rosy footman

- Thumatha senex, round-winged muslin — south, central & north (localized)
- Setina irrorella, dew moth — south & north-west (Nationally Scarce A)
- Miltochrista miniata, rosy footman — south & central (localized)
- Nudaria mundana, muslin footman — throughout (localized)
- Atolmis rubricollis, red-necked footman — south, west-central & north (localized)
- Cybosia mesomella, four-dotted footman — throughout (localized)
- Pelosia muscerda, dotted footman — east (Red Data Book)
- Pelosia obtusa, small dotted footman — east (Red Data Book)

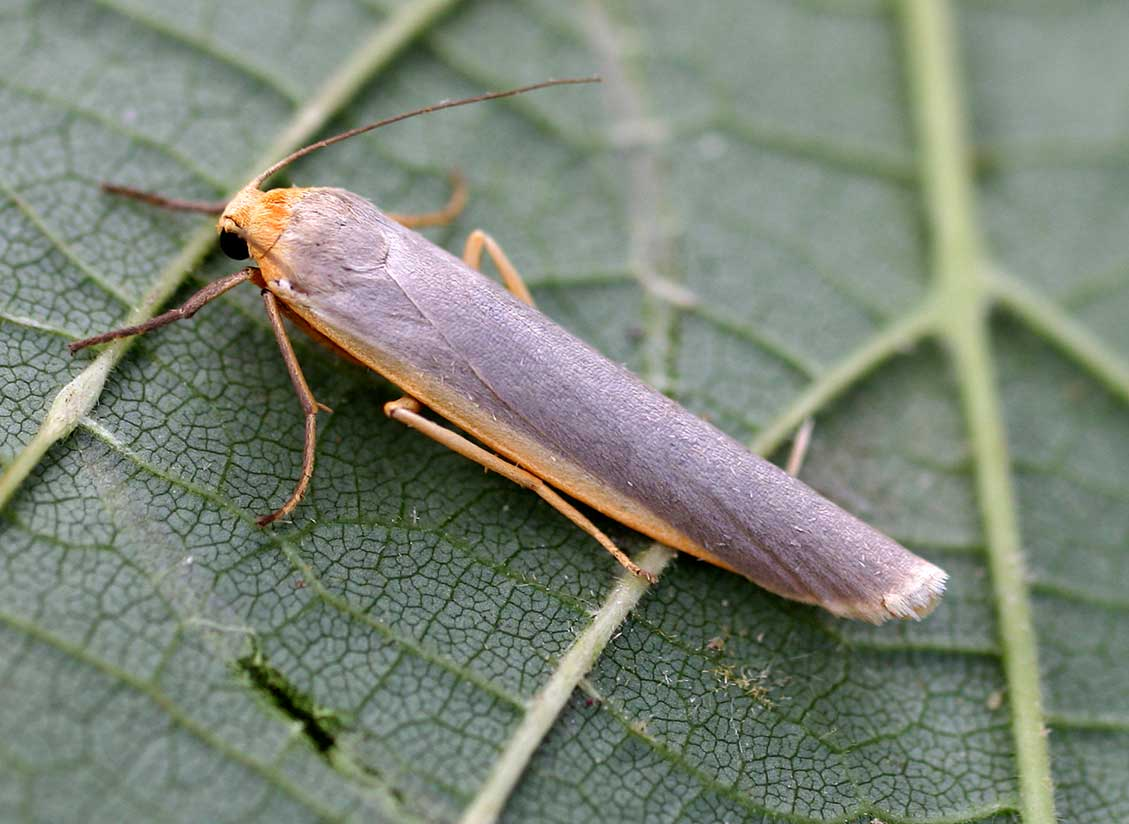
Scarce footman

- Eilema sororcula, orange footman — south (localized)
- Eilema griseola, dingy footman — south & central
- Eilema caniola, hoary footman — south-west (Nationally Scarce B)
- Eilema pygmaeola, pygmy footman (Red Data Book)

- Eilema pygmaeola pygmaeola — east
- Eilema pygmaeola pallifrons — south-east

- Eilema complana, scarce footman — south & central (localized)

- Eilema complana f. sericea, northern footman — west-central (Red Data Book)

- Eilema depressa, buff footman — south & central (localized)
- Eilema lurideola, common footman — south, central & north
- Lithosia quadra, four-spotted footman — immigrant to south-west (Nationally Scarce A)

== Tribe Arctiini ==
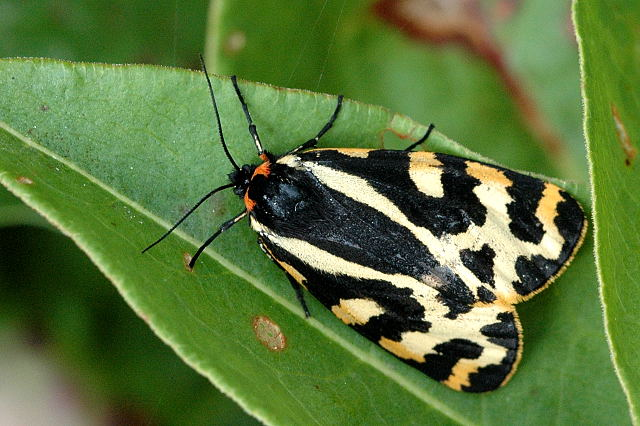
Wood tiger

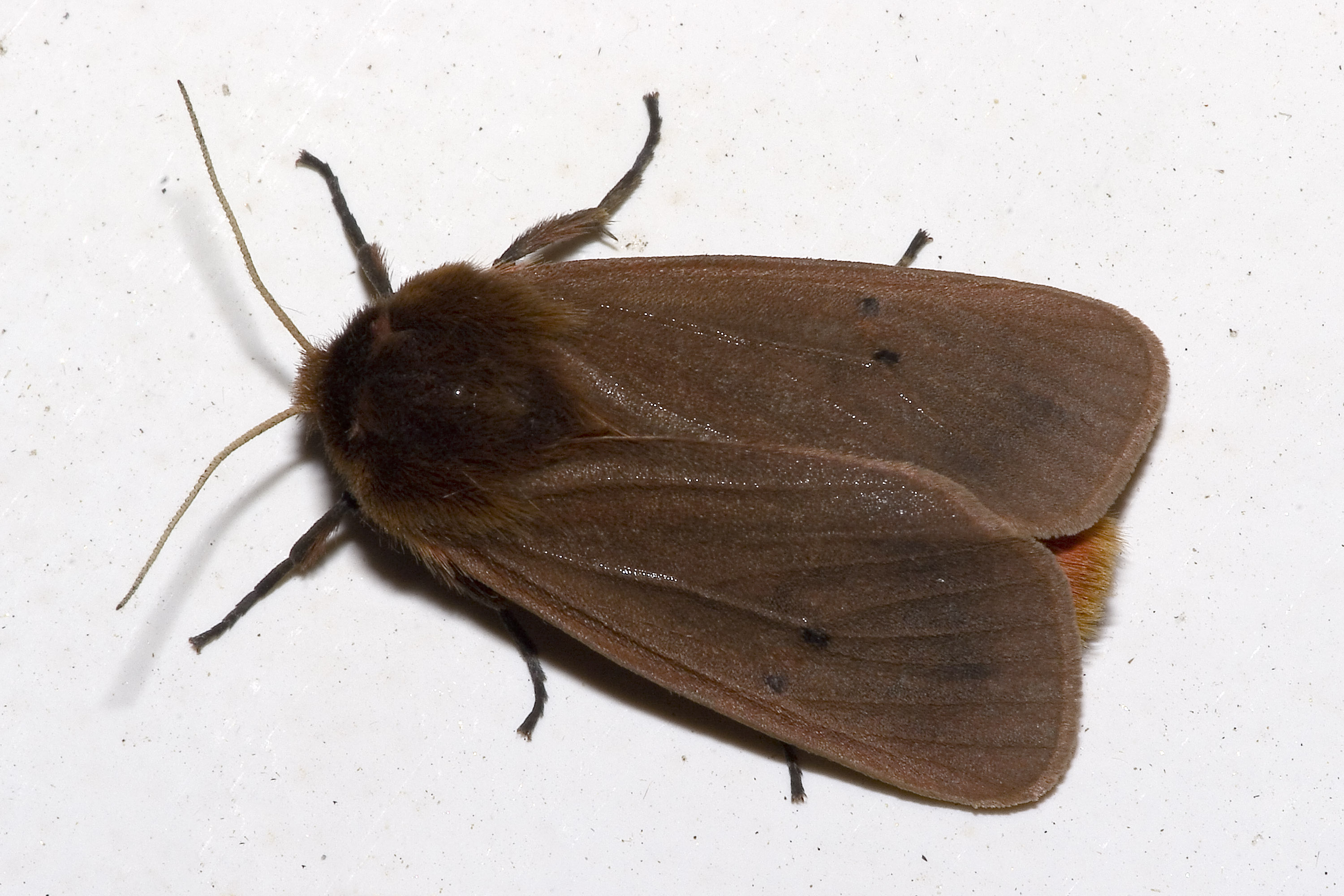
Ruby tiger

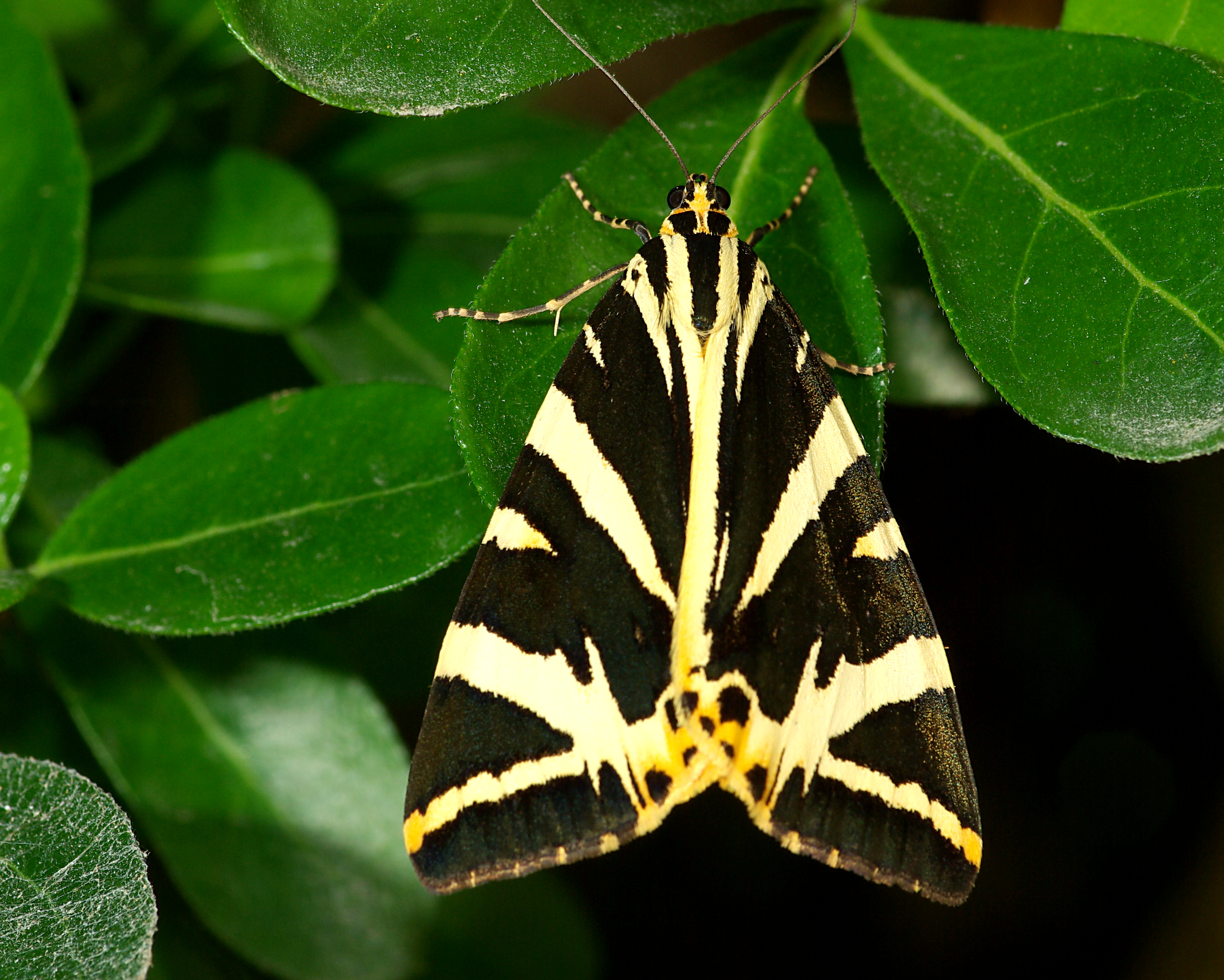
Jersey tiger

- [Spiris striata, feathered footman — uncertain status]
- Coscinia cribraria, speckled footman ‡

- Coscinia cribraria bivittata — south (Red Data Species)
- Coscinia cribraria arenaria — immigrant

- Utetheisa pulchella, crimson speckled — immigrant
- Utetheisa bella, beautiful utetheisa — probable rare immigrant (though possibly an import)
- Parasemia plantaginis, wood tiger

- Parasemia plantaginis plantaginis — throughout
- Parasemia plantaginis insularum — Shetland, Orkney & northern Scotland

- Arctia caja, garden tiger — throughout ‡*
- Arctia villica britannica, cream-spot tiger — south (localized)
- Hyphoraia testudinaria, Patton's tiger — vagrant: 2 records, Sussex & Devon
- Diacrisia sannio, clouded buff — throughout (localized)
- Spilosoma lubricipeda, white ermine — throughout ‡*
- Spilosoma luteum, buff ermine — south, central & north ‡*
- Spilosoma urticae, water ermine — south-east (Nationally Scarce B)
- Diaphora mendica, muslin moth — south, central & north
- Phragmatobia fuliginosa, ruby tiger

- Phragmatobia fuliginosa borealis — north
- Phragmatobia fuliginosa fuliginosa — south & central

- [Pyrrharctia isabella, isabelline tiger — accidental introduction]
- [Halysidota moeschleri — possible rare transatlantic immigrant or import]
- Euplagia quadripunctaria, Jersey tiger — south-west
- Callimorpha dominula, scarlet tiger — south-west (localized)
- Tyria jacobaeae, cinnabar — south, central & north ‡*
- [Hypercompe scribonia, great leopard — probable import]

Species listed in the 2007 UK Biodiversity Action Plan (BAP) are indicated by a double-dagger symbol (‡)—species so listed for research purposes only are also indicated with an asterisk (‡*).

== See also ==
- List of moths of Great Britain (overview)
  - Family lists: Hepialidae, Cossidae, Zygaenidae, Limacodidae, Sesiidae, Lasiocampidae, Saturniidae, Endromidae, Drepanidae, Thyatiridae, Geometridae, Sphingidae, Notodontidae, Thaumetopoeidae, Lymantriidae, Arctiidae, Ctenuchidae, Nolidae, Noctuidae and Micromoths
