= List of moths of Great Britain (Nolidae) =

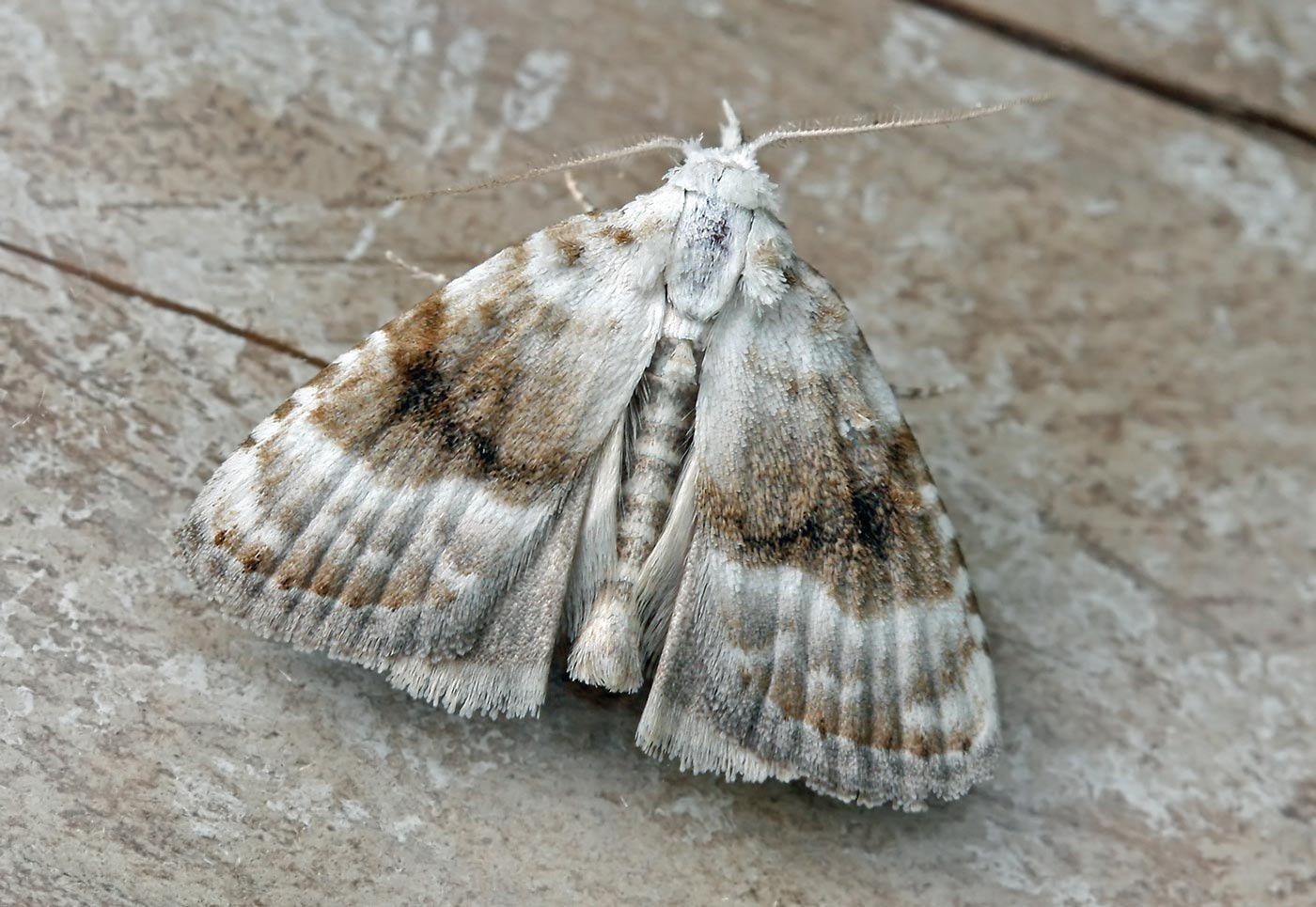
Kent black arches

The family Nolidae is represented by six species in Great Britain:

- Meganola strigula, small black arches — south (Nationally Scarce A)
- Meganola albula, Kent black arches — south-east (Nationally Scarce B)
- Nola cucullatella, short-cloaked moth — south & central
- Nola confusalis, least black arches — throughout (localized)
- Nola aerugula, scarce black arches — immigrant & transient resident (Kent, 1858–1898)
- Nola chlamytulalis, Jersey black arches — rare immigrant

== See also ==
- List of moths of Great Britain (overview)
  - Family lists: Hepialidae, Cossidae, Zygaenidae, Limacodidae, Sesiidae, Lasiocampidae, Saturniidae, Endromidae, Drepanidae, Thyatiridae, Geometridae, Sphingidae, Notodontidae, Thaumetopoeidae, Lymantriidae, Arctiidae, Ctenuchidae, Nolidae, Noctuidae and Micromoths
