= List of moths of Great Britain (Lymantriidae) =

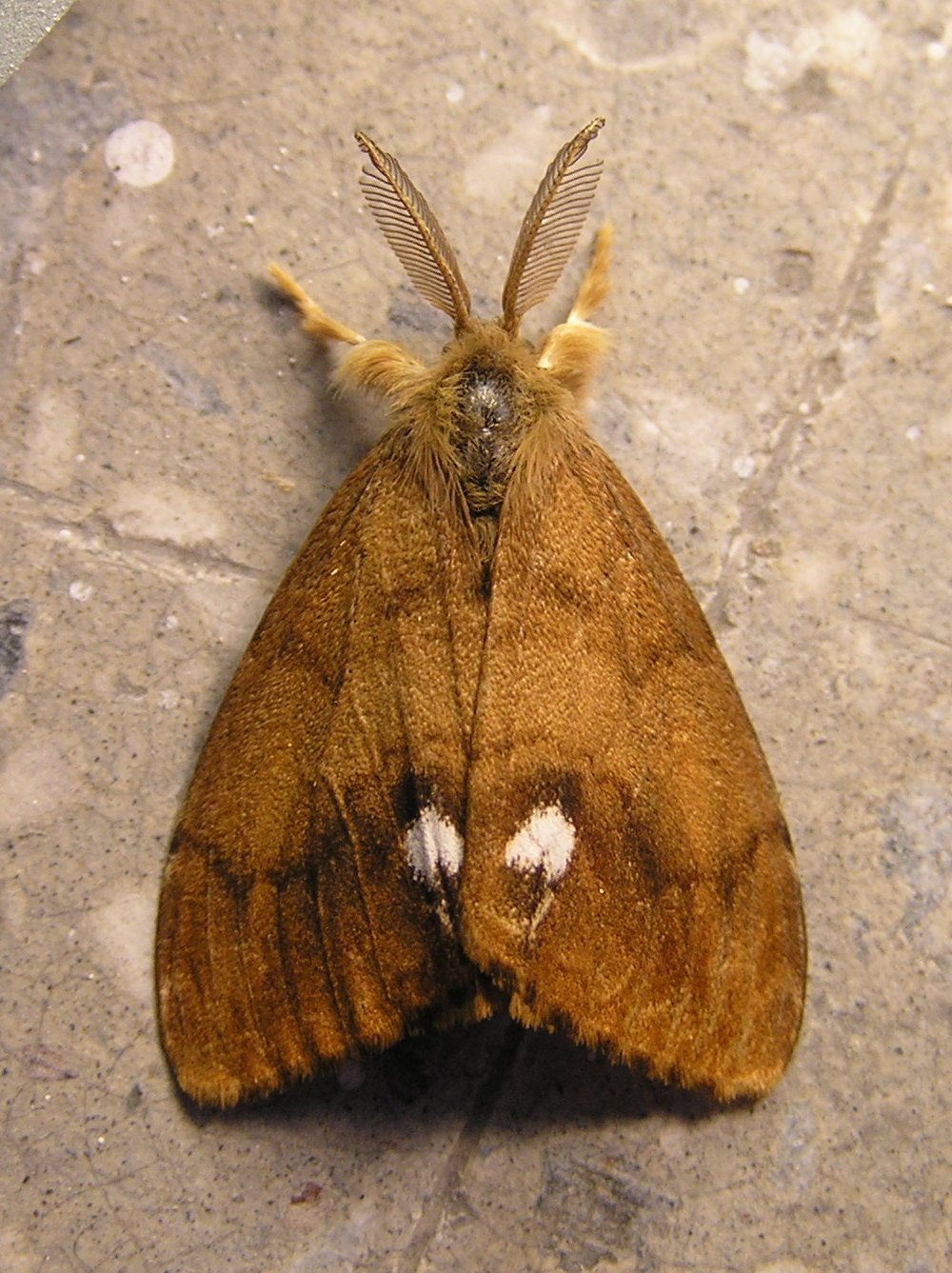
Vapourer (male)

The family Lymantriidae contains the "tussock moths", of which 11 have been recorded in Great Britain:

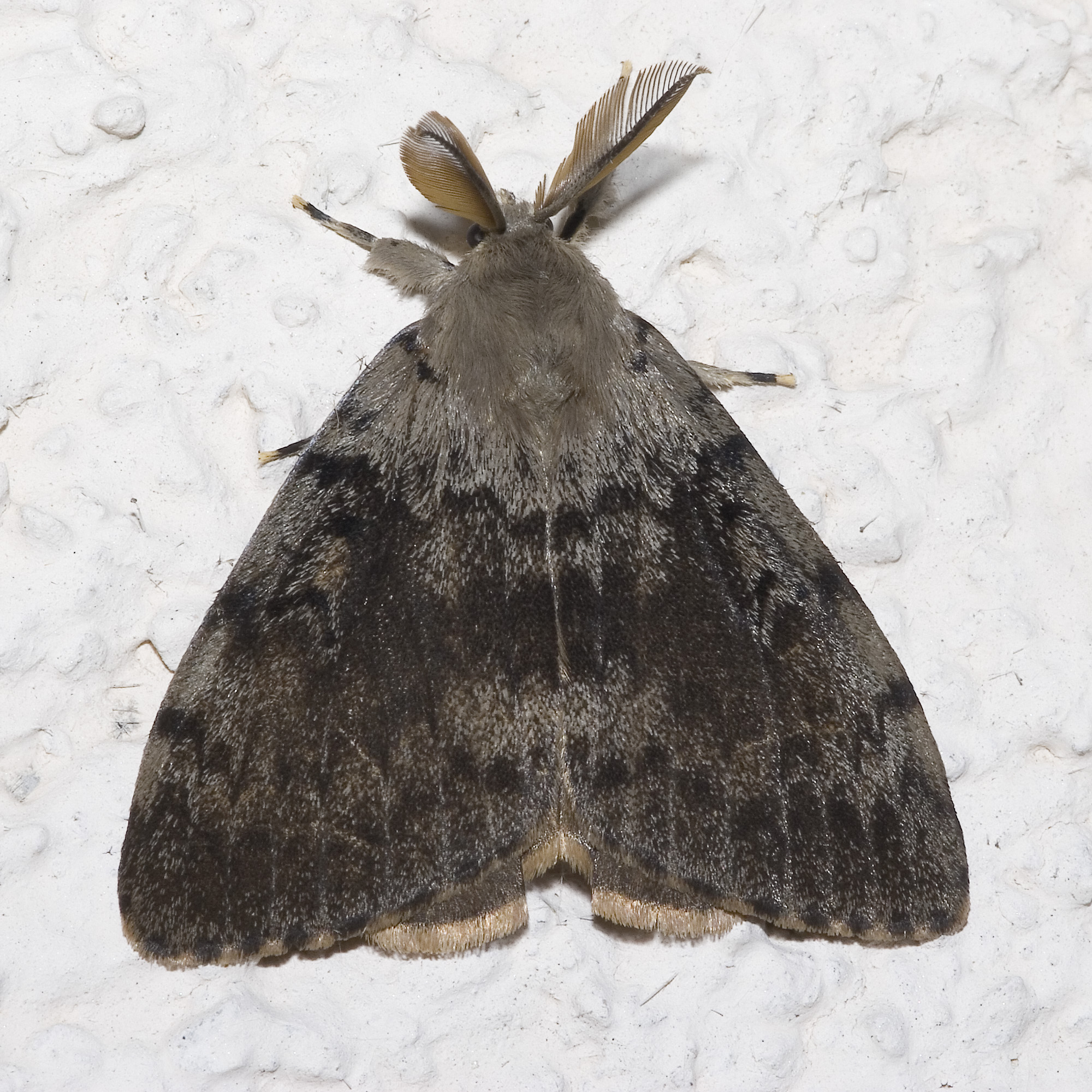
Gypsy moth (male)

- Laelia coenosa, reed tussock — extinct
- Orgyia recens, scarce vapourer — east-central (Red Data Book) ‡
- Orgyia antiqua, vapourer — throughout
- Dicallomera fascelina, dark tussock — south, west-central & north-east (localized)
- Calliteara pudibunda, pale tussock — south & central
- Euproctis chrysorrhoea, brown-tail — south, south-east & east-central (localized)
- Euproctis similis, yellow-tail — south, central & north
- Leucoma salicis, white satin — south, east-central, west-central & north (localized)
- Arctornis l-nigrum, black v moth — immigrant & transitory resident
- Lymantria monacha, black arches — south & central (localized)
- Lymantria dispar, spongy moth — immigrant (formerly resident)

Species listed in the 2007 UK Biodiversity Action Plan (BAP) are indicated by a double-dagger symbol (‡)—species so listed for research purposes only are also indicated with an asterisk (‡*).

== See also ==
- List of moths of Great Britain (overview)
  - Family lists: Hepialidae, Cossidae, Zygaenidae, Limacodidae, Sesiidae, Lasiocampidae, Saturniidae, Endromidae, Drepanidae, Thyatiridae, Geometridae, Sphingidae, Notodontidae, Thaumetopoeidae, Lymantriidae, Arctiidae, Ctenuchidae, Nolidae, Noctuidae and Micromoths
