= List of moths of Great Britain (Sphingidae) =

The family Sphingidae comprises the "hawk-moths", of which seventeen occur regularly in Great Britain:

== Subfamily Sphinginae ==
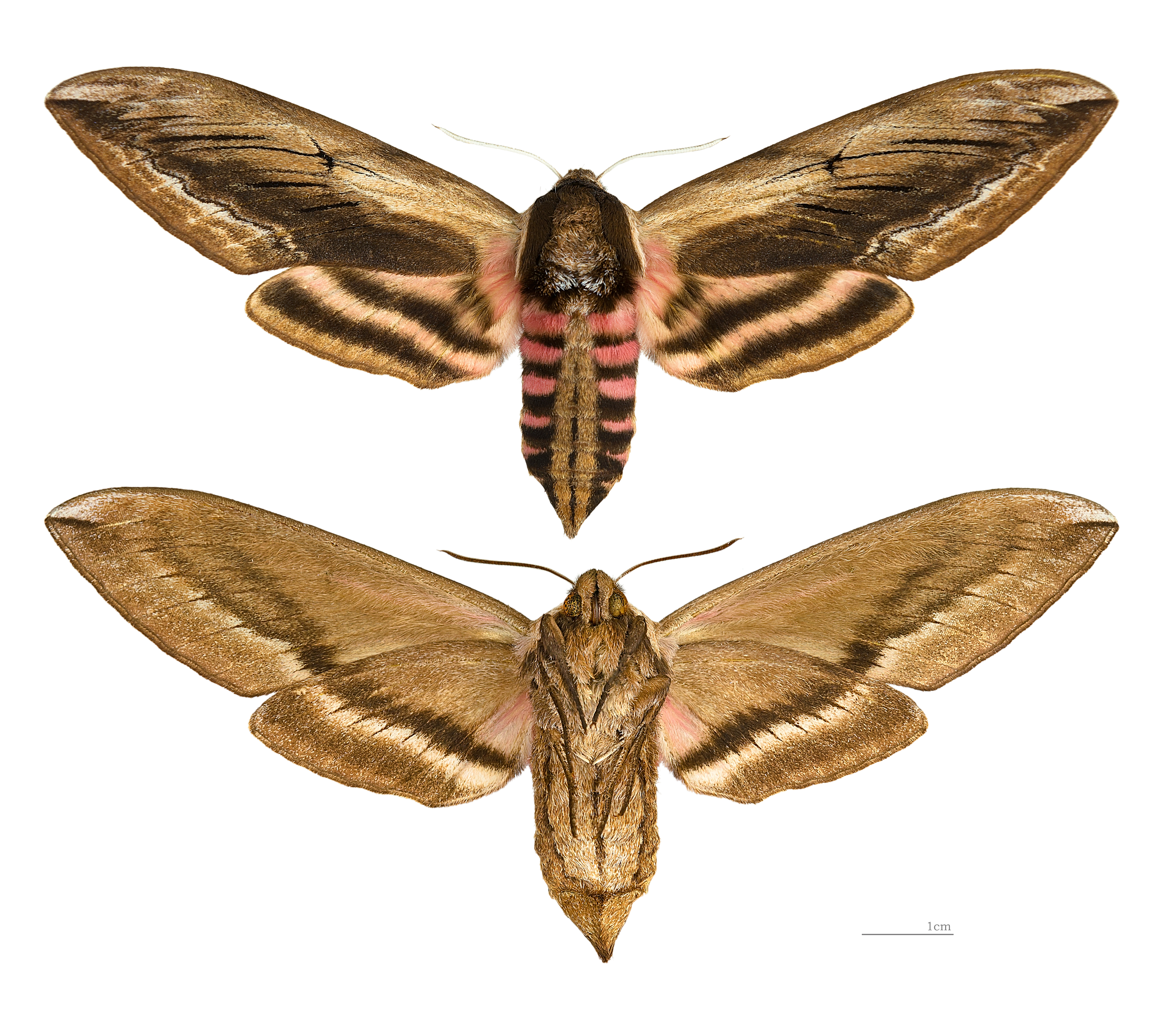
Privet hawk-moth

- [Agrius cingulata, pink-spotted hawk-moth — probable import]
- Agrius convolvuli, convolvulus hawk-moth — migrant
- Acherontia atropos, death's-head hawk-moth — migrant
- [Manduca quinquemaculata, five-spotted hawk-moth — probable import]
- [Manduca sexta, tomato sphinx — probable import]
- [Manduca rustica, rustic sphinx — probable import]
- Sphinx ligustri, privet hawk-moth — south
- [Sphinx drupiferarum, wild cherry sphinx — possible migrant, more likely import]
- Hyloicus pinastri, pine hawk-moth — south and south-east (localized)

== Subfamily Smerinthinae ==
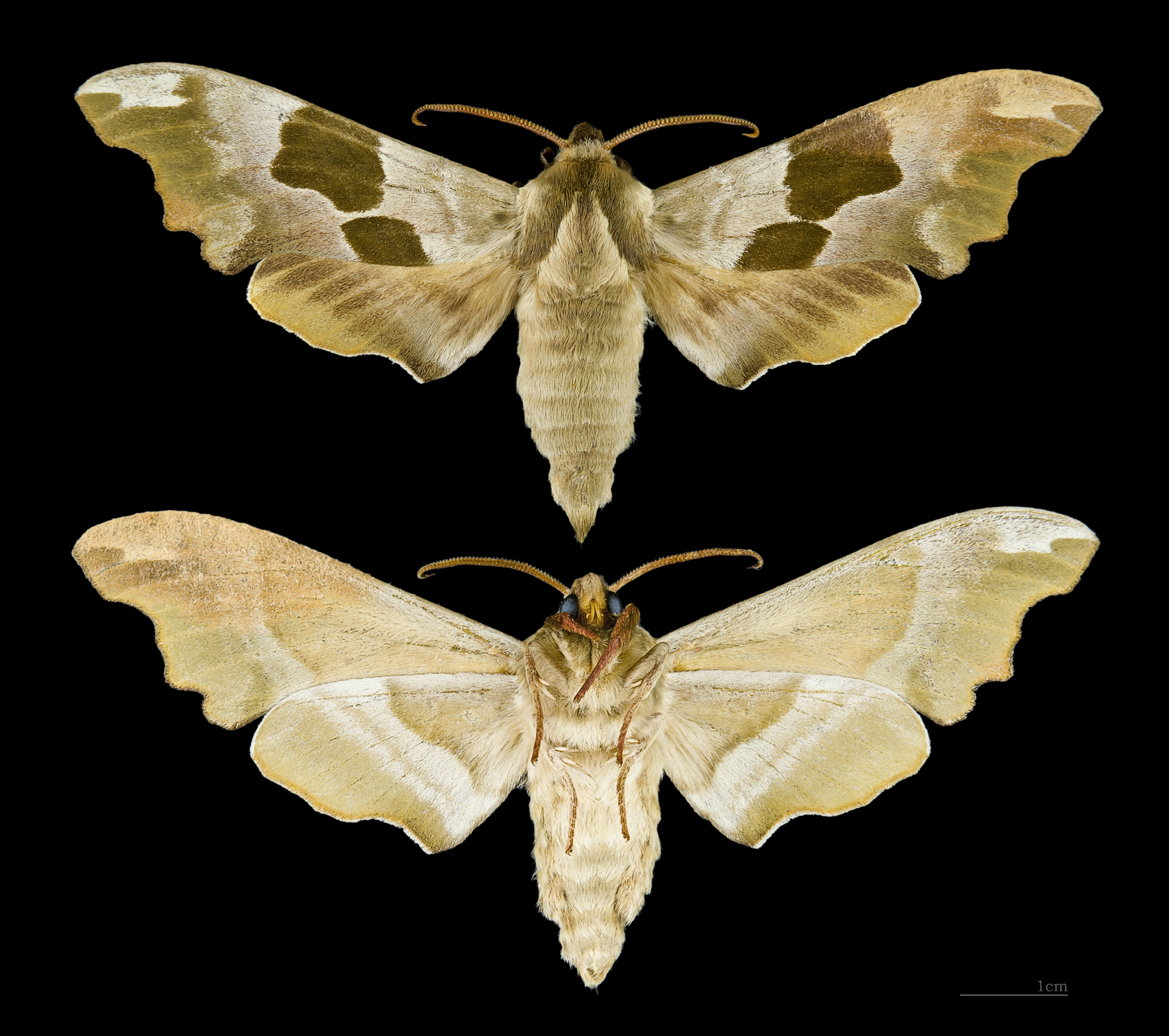
Lime hawk-moth

- Mimas tiliae, lime hawk-moth — south and centre
- Smerinthus ocellata, eyed hawk-moth — south and centre
- Laothoe populi, poplar hawk-moth — throughout

== Subfamily Macroglossinae ==
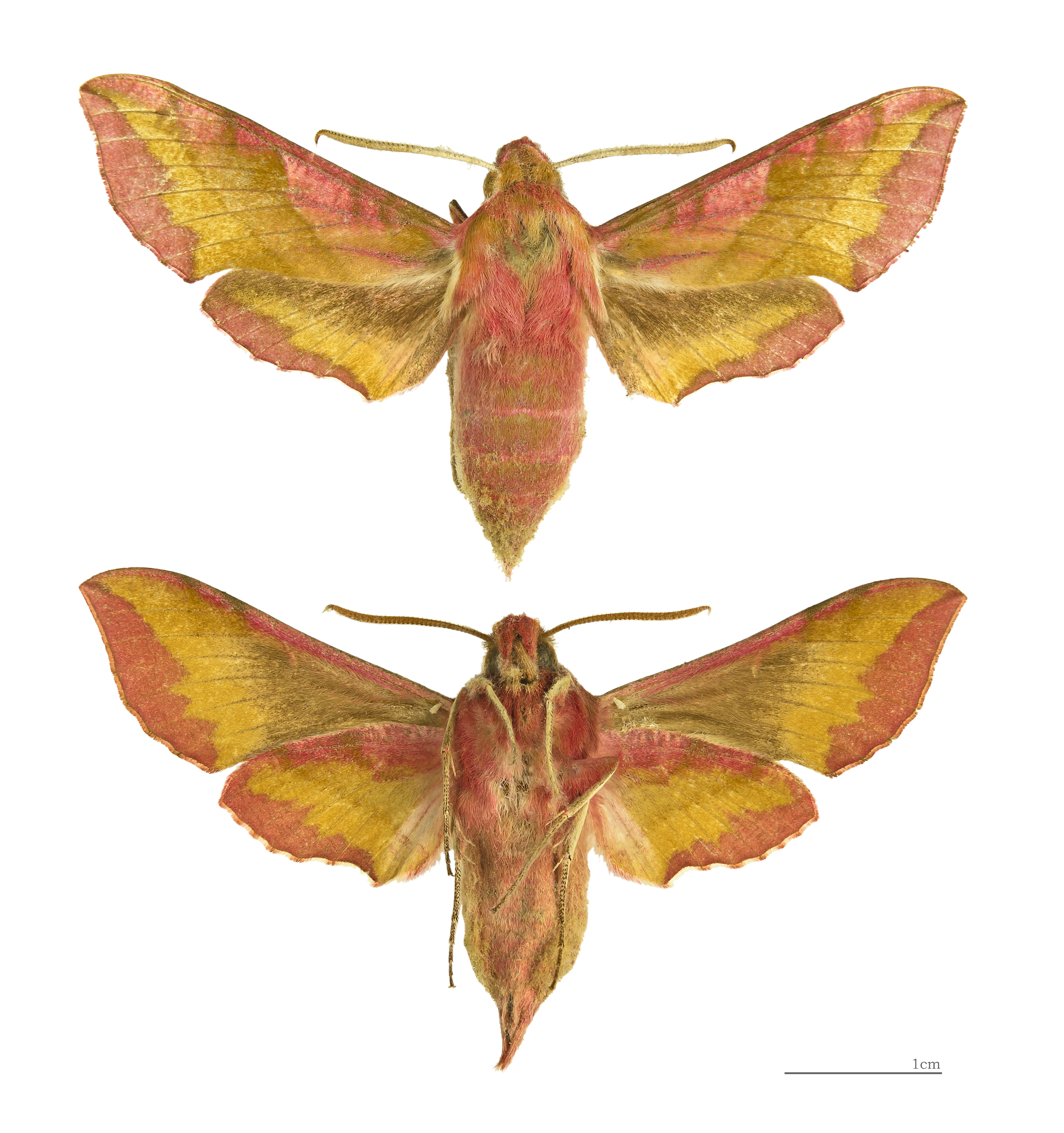
Small elephant hawk-moth

- Hemaris tityus, narrow-bordered bee hawkmoth — south-west, west-central, north-west and east (Nationally Scarce B) ‡
- Hemaris fuciformis, broad-bordered bee hawkmoth — south and east-central (Nationally Scarce B)
- Macroglossum stellatarum, hummingbird hawk-moth — common migrant, resident in south-west
- Proserpinus proserpina, willowherb hawk-moth — south and east (may be accidental import)
- Daphnis nerii, oleander hawk-moth — migrant
- Hyles euphorbiae, spurge hawk-moth — migrant
- Hyles gallii, bedstraw hawk-moth — migrant (occasionally over-winters)
- [Hyles nicaea, Mediterranean hawk-moth — possible migrant, more likely import]
- [Hyles hippophaes, seathorn hawk-moth — possible migrant, more likely import]
- Hyles livornica, striped hawk-moth — migrant
- Hyles lineata, white-lined hawk-moth — ?vagrant
- Deilephila elpenor, elephant hawk-moth — south and centre (common), north (rare)
- Deilephila porcellus, small elephant hawk-moth — south, centre and north (localized)
- Hippotion celerio, silver-striped hawk-moth — migrant

Species listed in the 2007 UK Biodiversity Action Plan (BAP) are indicated by a double-dagger symbol (‡)—species so listed for research purposes only are also indicated with an asterisk (‡*).

== See also ==
- List of moths of Great Britain (overview)
  - Family lists: Hepialidae, Cossidae, Zygaenidae, Limacodidae, Sesiidae, Lasiocampidae, Saturniidae, Endromidae, Drepanidae, Thyatiridae, Geometridae, Sphingidae, Notodontidae, Thaumetopoeidae, Lymantriidae, Arctiidae, Ctenuchidae, Nolidae, Noctuidae and Micromoths
