= List of moths of Great Britain (Hepialidae) =

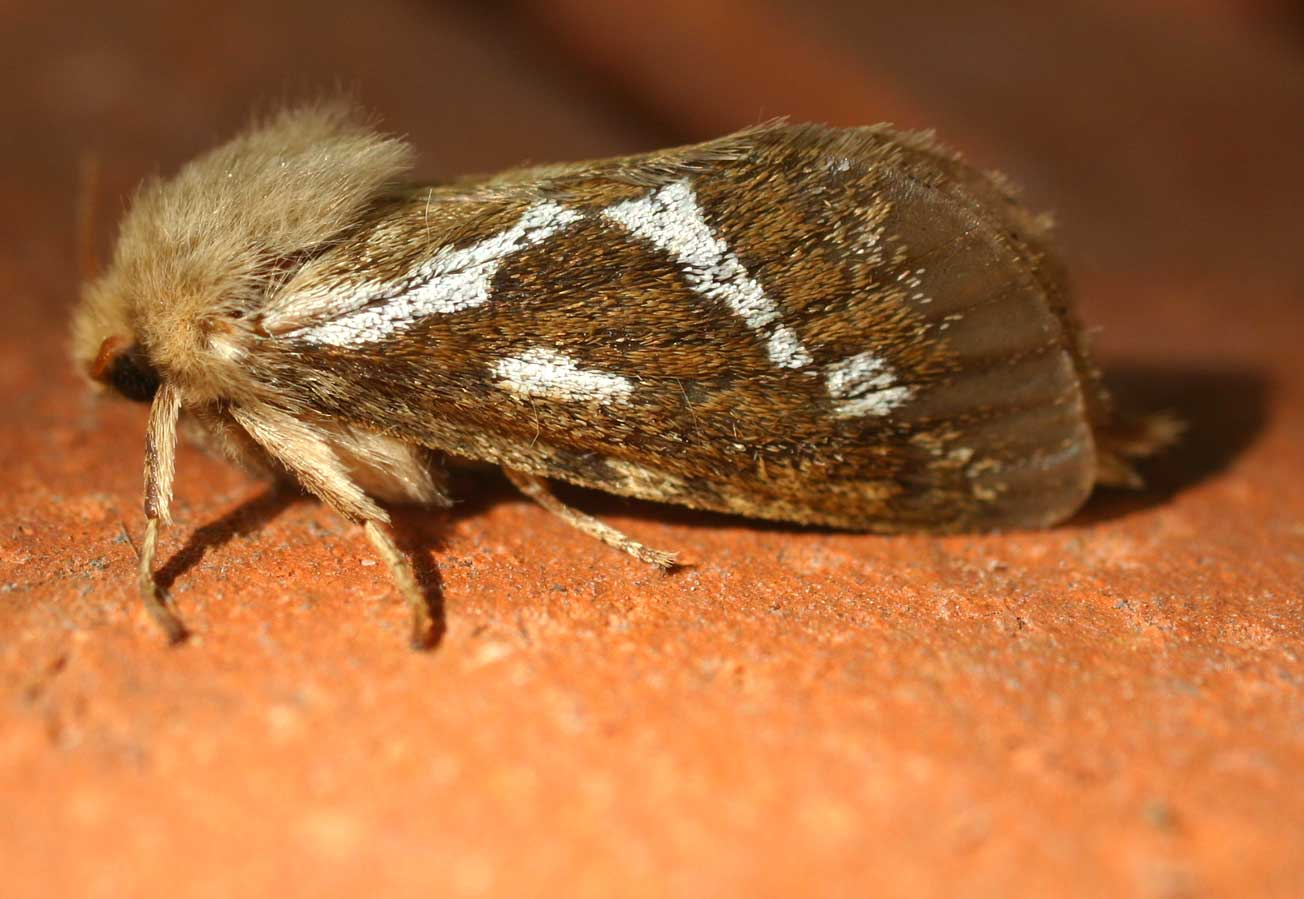
Common swift

The family Hepialidae comprises the "swift moths", of which five occur in Great Britain:

- Hepialus humuli, ghost moth ‡* — vulnerable

- Hepialus humuli humuli — throughout
- Hepialus humuli thulensis — Shetland Isles

- Hepialus sylvina, orange swift — throughout
- Hepialus hecta, gold swift — throughout (local)
- Hepialus lupulinus, common swift — throughout
- Hepialus fusconebulosa, map-winged swift — throughout (local)

Species listed in the 2007 UK Biodiversity Action Plan (BAP) are indicated by a double-dagger symbol (‡)—species so listed for research purposes only are also indicated with an asterisk (‡*).

== See also ==
- List of moths of Great Britain (overview)
  - Family lists: Hepialidae, Cossidae, Zygaenidae, Limacodidae, Sesiidae, Lasiocampidae, Saturniidae, Endromidae, Drepanidae, Thyatiridae, Geometridae, Sphingidae, Notodontidae, Thaumetopoeidae, Lymantriidae, Arctiidae, Ctenuchidae, Nolidae, Noctuidae and Micromoths
