= List of moths of Great Britain (Thyatiridae) =

The family Thyatiridae comprises about 200 species, nine of which occur in Great Britain:

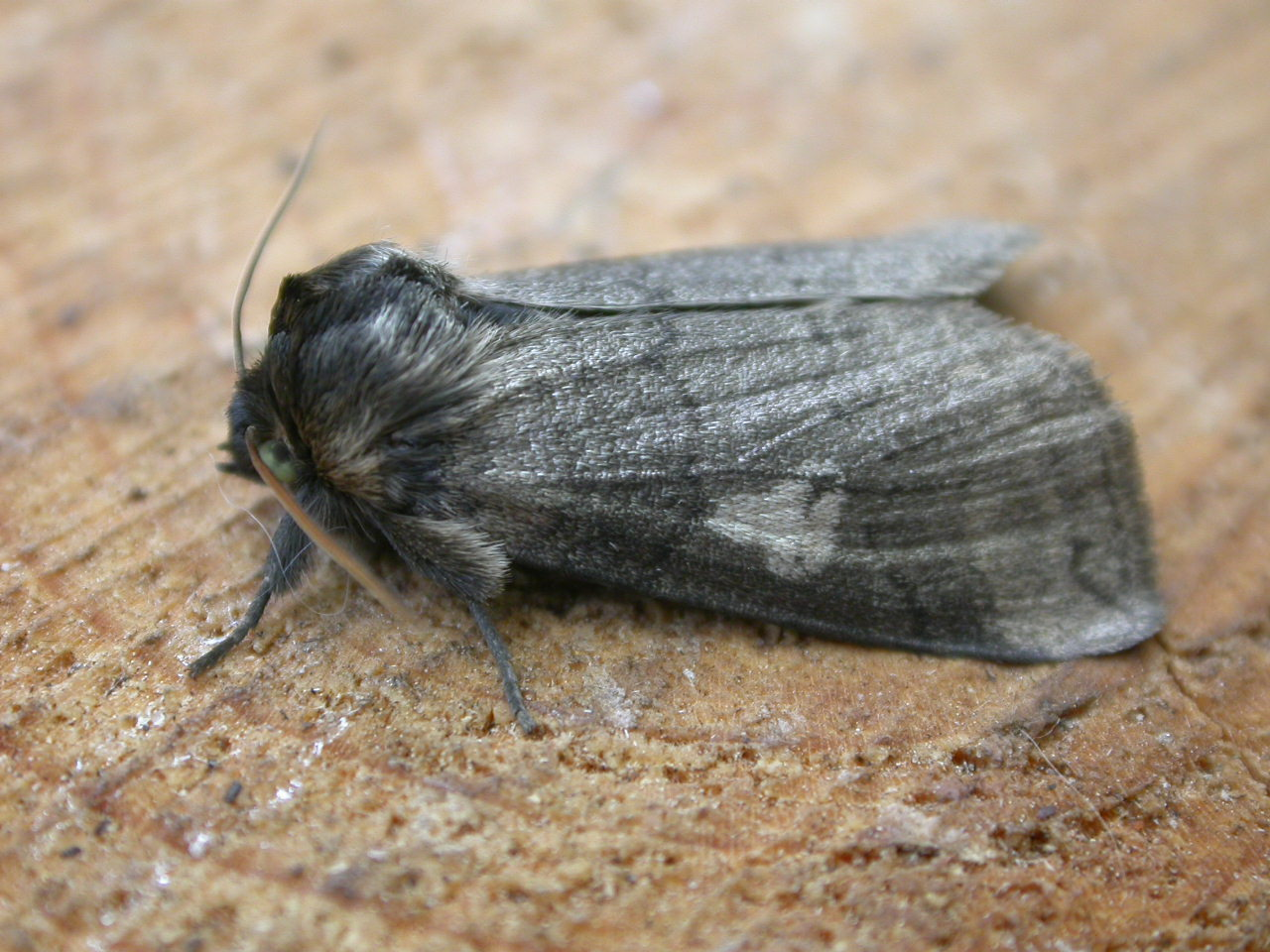
Poplar lutestring

- Thyatira batis, peach blossom — throughout
- Habrosyne pyritoides, buff arches — south and centre
- Tethea ocularis octogesimea, figure of eighty — south and centre
- Tethea or, poplar lutestring

- Tethea or or — south (local)
- Tethea or scotica — north (local)

- Tetheella fluctuosa, satin lutestring — south-east and west (local)
- Ochropacha duplaris, common lutestring — throughout
- Cymatophorima diluta hartwiegi, oak lutestring — south and centre (local) (Vulnerable) ‡*
- Achlya flavicornis, yellow horned

- Achlya flavicornis galbanus — south and centre
- Achlya flavicornis scotica — north

- Polyploca ridens, frosted green — south (local)

Species listed in the 2007 UK Biodiversity Action Plan (BAP) are indicated by a double-dagger symbol (‡)—species so listed for research purposes only are also indicated with an asterisk (‡*).

== See also ==
- List of moths of Great Britain (overview)
  - Family lists: Hepialidae, Cossidae, Zygaenidae, Limacodidae, Sesiidae, Lasiocampidae, Saturniidae, Endromidae, Drepanidae, Thyatiridae, Geometridae, Sphingidae, Notodontidae, Thaumetopoeidae, Lymantriidae, Arctiidae, Ctenuchidae, Nolidae, Noctuidae and Micromoths
