= List of moths of Great Britain (Limacodidae) =

The family Limacodidae is mostly tropical, but has two representatives in Great Britain:

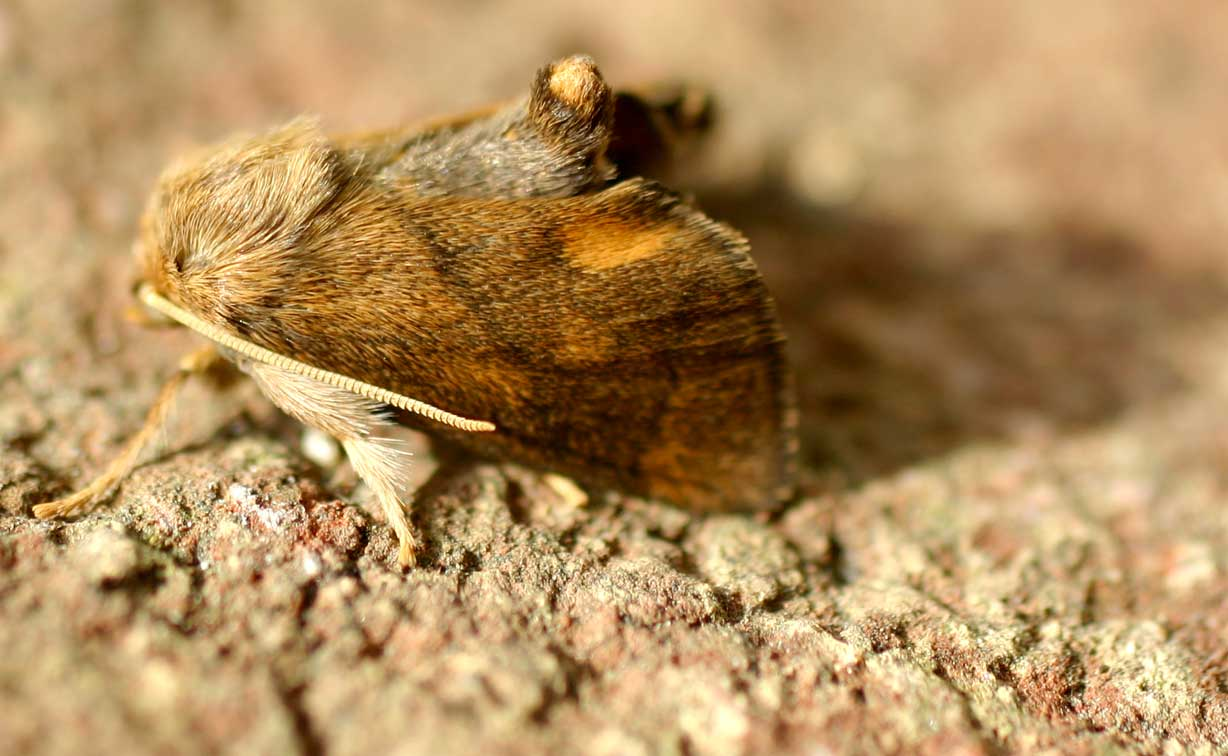
Festoon

- Apoda limacodes, festoon — south, east (not south-west) (Nationally Scarce B)
- Heterogenea asella, triangle — south, east (Red Data Book)

== See also ==
- List of moths of Great Britain (overview)
  - Family lists: Hepialidae, Cossidae, Zygaenidae, Limacodidae, Sesiidae, Lasiocampidae, Saturniidae, Endromidae, Drepanidae, Thyatiridae, Geometridae, Sphingidae, Notodontidae, Thaumetopoeidae, Lymantriidae, Arctiidae, Ctenuchidae, Nolidae, Noctuidae and Micromoths
