= List of moths of Great Britain (Zygaenidae) =

The family Zygaenidae comprises the "forester and burnet moths", of which ten species occur in Great Britain:

== Subfamily Procridinae ==
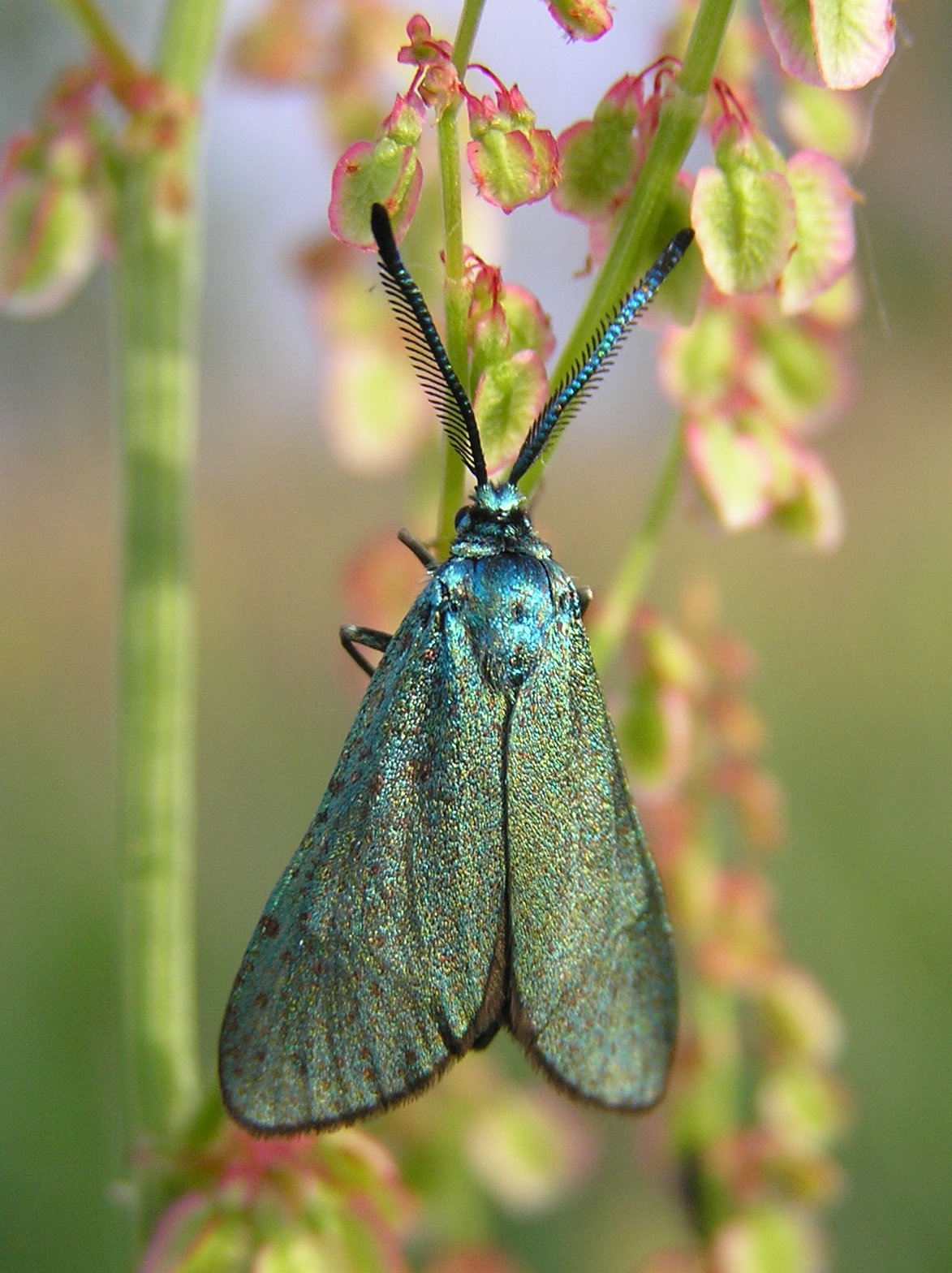
Forester (male)

- Adscita statices, forester — south & centre (local) ‡
- Adscita geryon, cistus forester — south & centre (Nationally Scarce B)
- Jordanita globulariae, scarce forester — south (Nationally Scarce A)

== Subfamily Zygaeninae ==
- Zygaena exulans, Scotch (or mountain) burnet

- Zygaena exulans subochracea — eastern Cairngorms (Red Data Book)

- Zygaena loti, slender Scotch burnet ‡

- Zygaena loti scotica — islands of Mull & Ulva (Red Data Book)

- Zygaena viciae, New Forest burnet ‡

- Zygaena viciae argyllensis — western Argyllshire (Red Data Book)
- Zygaena viciae ytenensis — New Forest (extinct)

- Zygaena filipendulae, six-spot burnet

- Zygaena filipendulae stephensi — throughout

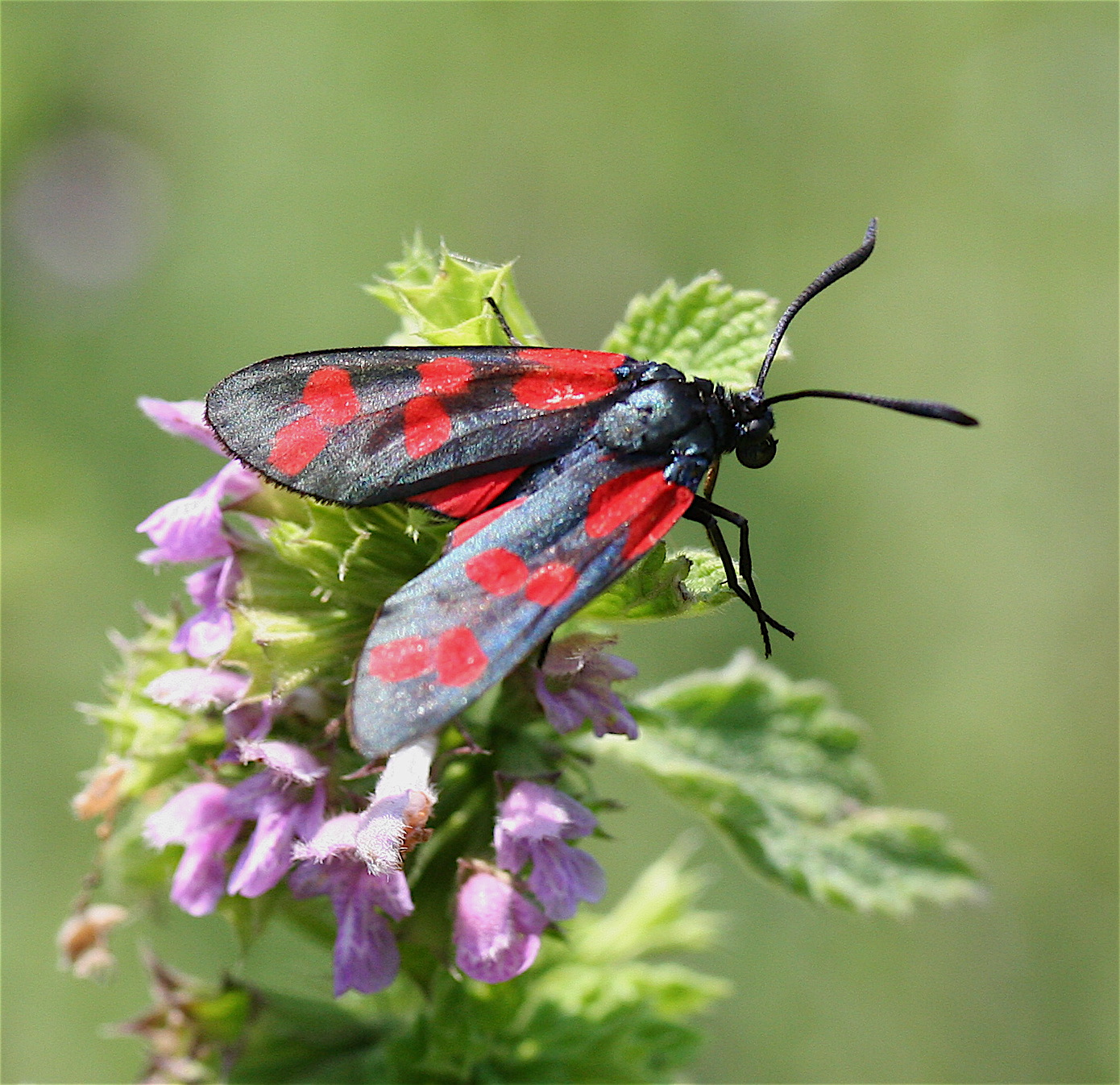
Six-spot burnet

- Zygaena trifolii, five-spot burnet

- Zygaena trifolii decreta — south & west-central (local)
- Zygaena trifolii palustrella — south & east (local)

- Zygaena lonicerae, narrow-bordered five-spot burnet

- Zygaena lonicerae latomarginata — England, Wales
- Zygaena lonicerae jocelynae — island of Skye (Red Data Book)

- Zygaena purpuralis, transparent burnet

- Zygaena purpuralis segontii — Lleyn Peninsula (Red Data Book, presumed extinct)
- Zygaena purpuralis caledonensis — Hebrides (Nationally Scarce A)

Species listed in the 2007 UK Biodiversity Action Plan (BAP) are indicated by a double-dagger symbol (‡).

== See also ==
- List of moths of Great Britain (overview)
  - Family lists: Hepialidae, Cossidae, Zygaenidae, Limacodidae, Sesiidae, Lasiocampidae, Saturniidae, Endromidae, Drepanidae, Thyatiridae, Geometridae, Sphingidae, Notodontidae, Thaumetopoeidae, Lymantriidae, Arctiidae, Ctenuchidae, Nolidae, Noctuidae and Micromoths
