= List of moths of Great Britain =

In excess of 2400 species of moth have been recorded in Great Britain.

This page provides a link to detailed lists of these moths by family.

== Macromoths ==
- Hepialidae
- Cossidae
- Zygaenidae
- Limacodidae
- Sesiidae
- Lasiocampidae
- Saturniidae
- Endromidae
- Drepanidae
- Thyatiridae
- Geometridae
- Sphingidae
- Notodontidae
- Thaumetopoeidae
- Lymantriidae
- Arctiidae
- Ctenuchidae
- Nolidae
- Noctuidae

== Micromoths ==
- Micromoths

== See also ==
- List of butterflies of Great Britain
