= List of moths of Great Britain (Endromidae) =

The family Endromidae comprises just one species, which is a scarce resident in Scotland:

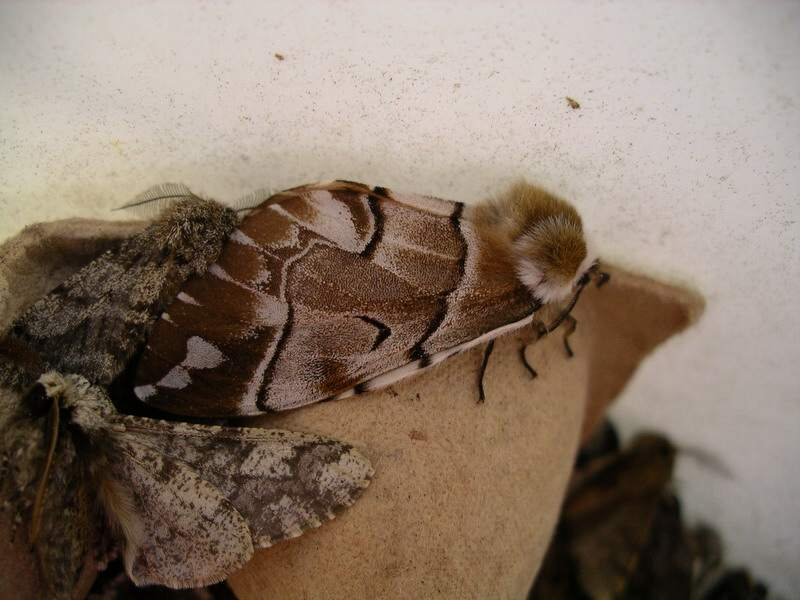
Kentish glory

- Endromis versicolora, Kentish glory — eastern Scotland (Nationally Scarce A) (formerly local in parts of England and Monmouthshire)

== See also ==
- List of moths of Great Britain (overview)
  - Family lists: Hepialidae, Cossidae, Zygaenidae, Limacodidae, Sesiidae, Lasiocampidae, Saturniidae, Endromidae, Drepanidae, Thyatiridae, Geometridae, Sphingidae, Notodontidae, Thaumetopoeidae, Lymantriidae, Arctiidae, Ctenuchidae, Nolidae, Noctuidae and Micromoths
