= List of moths of Great Britain (Cossidae) =

The family Cossidae comprises the "leopard and goat moths", of which three occur in Great Britain:

== Subfamily Zeuzerinae ==
- Phragmataecia castaneae, reed leopard — east & south (Red Data Book)
- Zeuzera pyrina, leopard moth — east, south & central

== Subfamily Cossinae ==
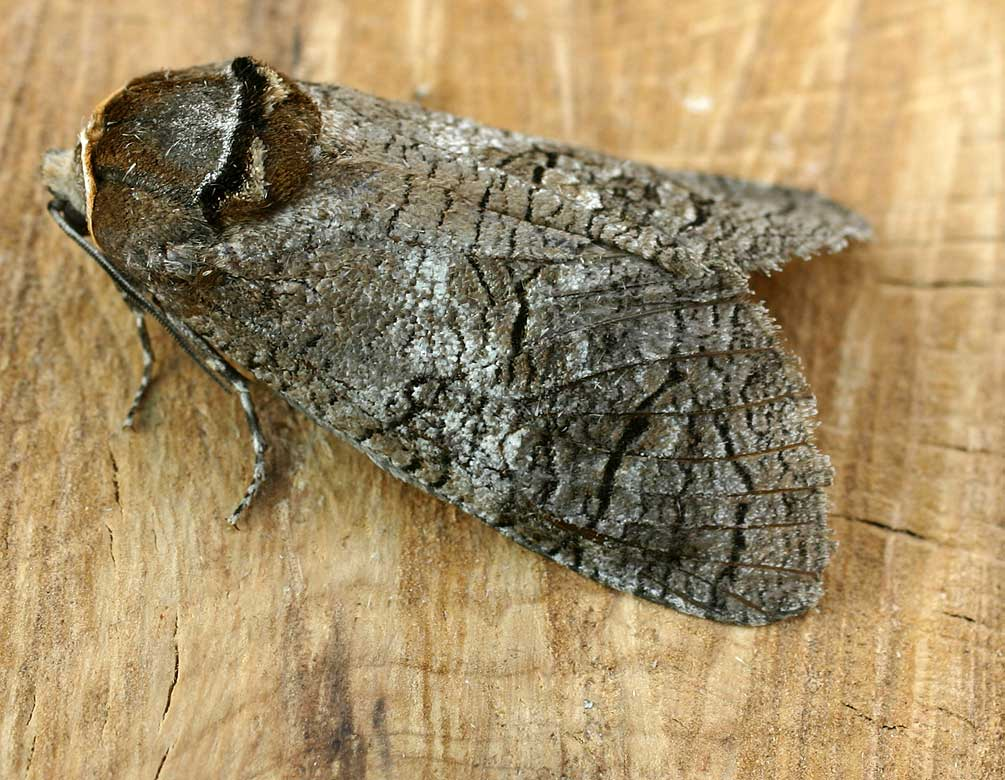
Goat moth

- Cossus cossus, goat moth — throughout (nationally scarce B) ‡

Species listed in the 2007 UK Biodiversity Action Plan (BAP) are indicated by a double-dagger symbol (‡).

== See also ==
- List of moths of Great Britain (overview)
  - Family lists: Hepialidae, Cossidae, Zygaenidae, Limacodidae, Sesiidae, Lasiocampidae, Saturniidae, Endromidae, Drepanidae, Thyatiridae, Geometridae, Sphingidae, Notodontidae, Thaumetopoeidae, Lymantriidae, Arctiidae, Ctenuchidae, Nolidae, Noctuidae and Micromoths
