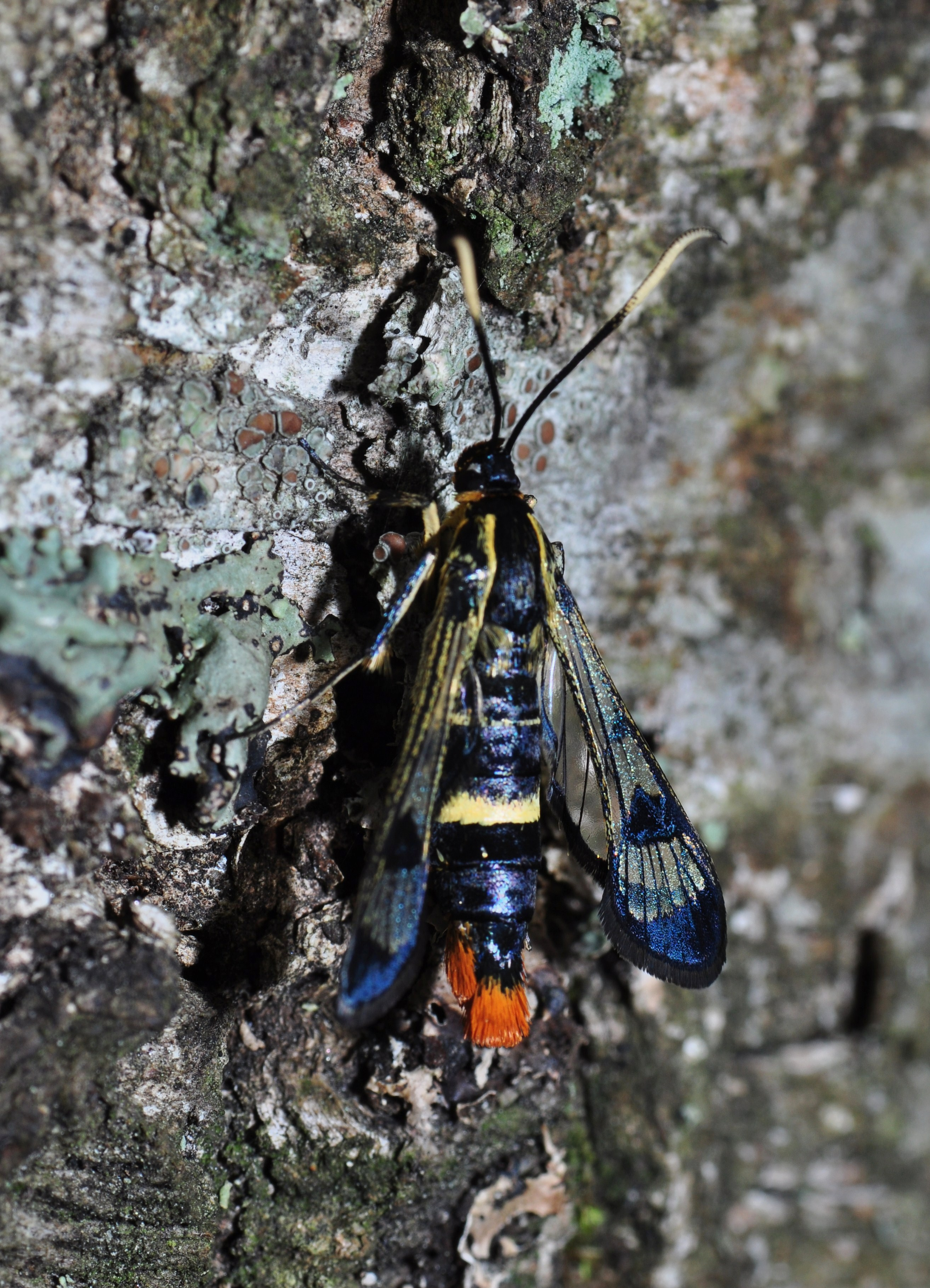

Scientific classification
- Kingdom: Animalia
- Phylum: Arthropoda
- Clade: Pancrustacea
- Class: Insecta
- Order: Lepidoptera
- Family: Sesiidae
- Genus: Synanthedon
- Species: S. scoliaeformis

Binomial name
- Synanthedon scoliaeformis (Borkhausen, 1789)

Synonyms
- Sphinx scoliaeformis Borkhausen, 1789; Sesia scoliiformis Staudinger, 1856; Sesia thynniformis Laspeyres, 1801; Sesia emphytiformis Herrich-Schäffer, 1846 (nec Walker, 1856); Sesia deserta Staudinger, 1887; Synanthedon danieli Capuse, 1973; Synanthedon scoliaeformis f. aurea Pühringer, 1998; Synanthedon scoliaeformis f. aura Pühringer, 1998

= Synanthedon scoliaeformis =

Species of moth

Synanthedon scoliaeformis, the Welsh clearwing, is a moth of the family Sesiidae. It is found from almost all of Europe (except the Netherlands, Portugal and the western part of the Balkan Peninsula), east through Russia to Japan.

The wingspan is 30–36 mm.

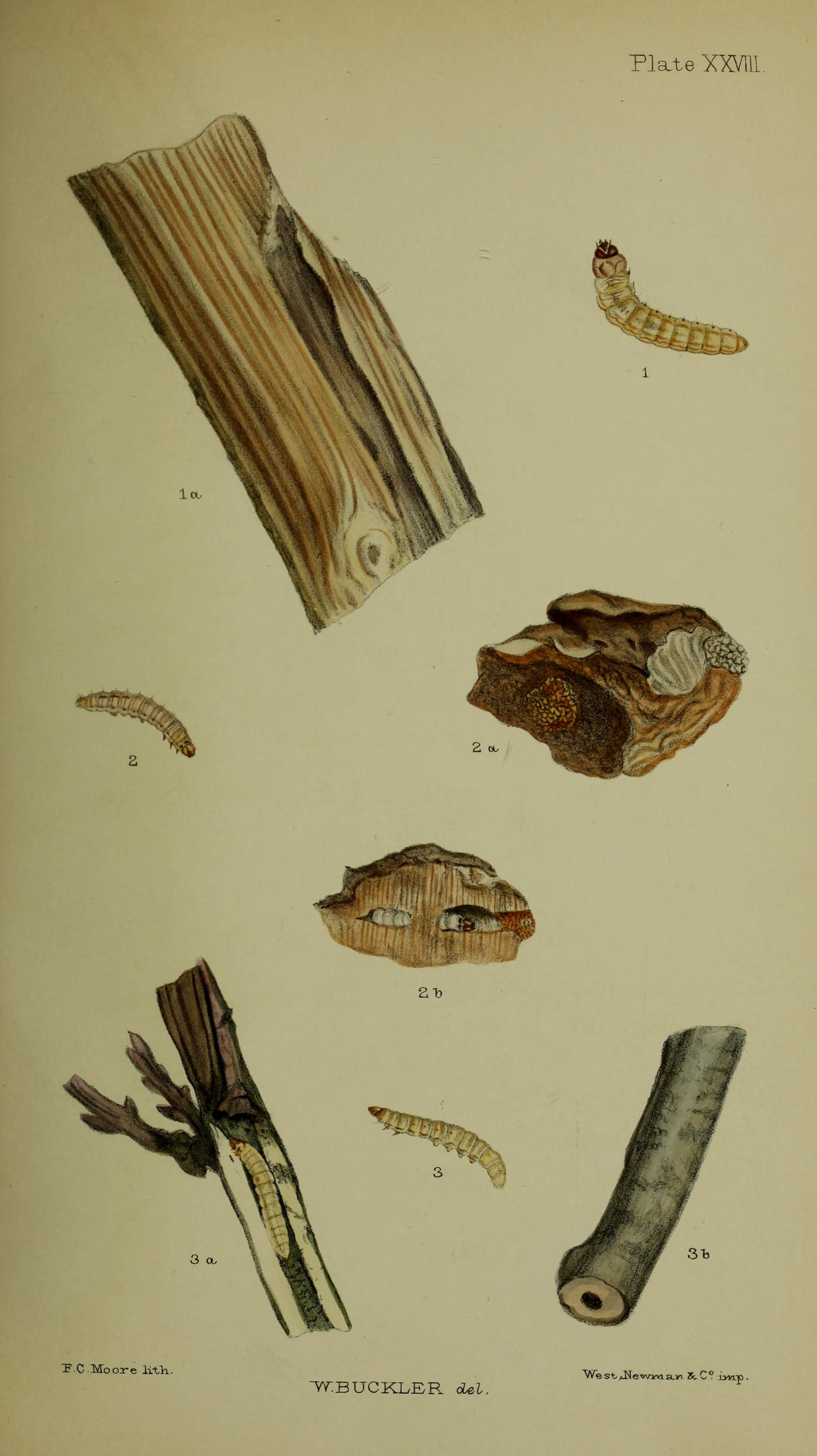
Figs. 2 larvae after last moult 2a, 2b pieces of birch bark burrowed by the larva

The larvae feed on Betula pubescens and Betula pendula. They bore into mature trees and feed on the bark within.

== Subspecies ==
- Synanthedon scoliaeformis scoliaeformis
- Synanthedon scoliaeformis japonica Špatenka & Arita, 1992
