= Insect migration =

Seasonal movement of insects

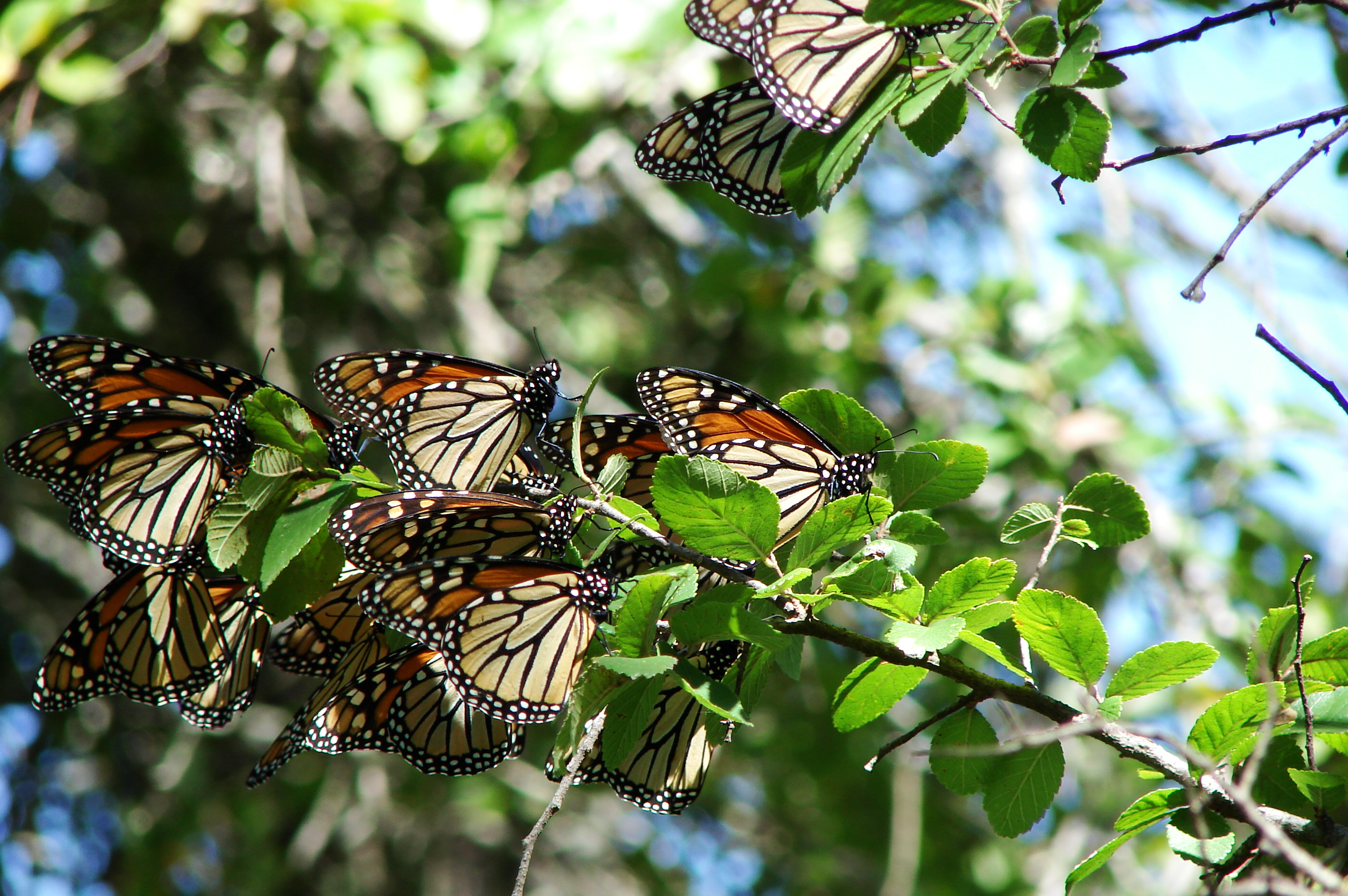
Monarch butterflies roosting on migration in Texas

Insect migration is the seasonal movement of insects, particularly those by species of dragonflies, beetles, butterflies and moths. The distance can vary with species and in most cases, these movements involve large numbers of individuals. In some cases, the individuals that migrate in one direction may not return and the next generation may instead migrate in the opposite direction. This is a significant difference from bird migration.

== Definition ==
All insects move to some extent. The range of movement can vary from within a few centimeters for some sucking insects and wingless aphids to thousands of kilometers in the case of other insects such as locusts, butterflies and dragonflies. The definition of migration is therefore particularly difficult in the context of insects. A behavior-oriented definition proposed is

Migratory behavior is persistent and straightened-out movement affected by the animal's own locomotory exertions or by its active embarkation on a vehicle. It depends upon some temporary inhibition of station-keeping responses but promotes their eventual disinhibition and recurrence.

— Kennedy, 1985

This definition disqualifies movements made in the search of resources and which are terminated upon finding the resource. Migration involves longer distance movement and these movements are not affected by the availability of the resource items. All cases of long-distance insect migration concern winged insects.

== General patterns ==
Many migrating butterflies fly at low altitudes. The airspeeds in this region are typically lower than the flight speed of the insect, allowing them to travel against the wind if need be. These 'boundary-layer' migrants include the larger day-flying insects, and their low-altitude flight is easier to observe than that of most high-altitude windborne migrants. Some species of butterfly (such as Vanessa atalanta and Danaus plexippus) are known to migrate using high-altitude, high-speed winds during their yearly migrations.

Many migratory species tend to have polymorphic forms, a migratory one, and a resident phase. The migratory phases are marked by their well-developed and long wings. Such polymorphism is well known in aphids and grasshoppers. In the migratory locusts, there are distinct long and short-winged forms.

The energetic cost of migration has been studied in the context of life-history strategies. It has been suggested that adaptations for migration would be more valuable for insects that live in habitats where resource availability changes seasonally. Others have suggested that species living in isolated islands of suitable habitats are more likely to evolve migratory strategies. The role of migration in gene flow has also been studied in many species. Parasite loads affect migration. Severely infected individuals are weak and have shortened lifespans. Infection creates an effect known as culling whereby migrating animals are less likely to complete the migration. This results in populations with lower parasite loads.

== Orientation ==
Migration is usually marked by well defined destinations which need navigation and orientation. A flying insect needs to make corrections for crosswinds. It has been demonstrated that many migrating insects sense wind speed and direction and make suitable corrections. Day-flying insects primarily make use of the sun for orientation, however, this requires that they compensate for the movement of the sun. Endogenous time-compensation mechanisms have been proposed and tested by releasing migrating butterflies that have been captured and kept in darkness to shift their internal clocks and observing changes in the directions chosen by them. Some species appear to make corrections while it has not been demonstrated in others.

Most insects are capable of sensing polarized light and they are able to use the polarization of the sky when the sun is occluded by clouds. The orientation mechanisms of nocturnal moths and other insects that migrate have not been well studied, however magnetic cues have been suggested in short distance fliers.

Recent studies suggest that migratory butterflies may be sensitive to the Earth's magnetic field on the basis of the presence of magnetite particles. In an experiment on the monarch butterfly, it was shown that a magnet changed the direction of initial flight of migrating monarch butterflies. However this result was not a strong demonstration since the directions of the experimental butterflies and the controls did not differ significantly in the direction of flight.

== Lepidoptera ==
Distribution map of Macroglossum stellatarum showing their migration pattern. Blue, summer; green, year round; yellow, winter

Migration of butterflies and moths is particularly well known.

The bogong moth is a native insect of Australia that is known to migrate to cooler climates. The Madagascan sunset moth (Chrysiridia rhipheus) has migrations of up to thousands of individuals, occurring between the eastern and western ranges of their host plant, when they become depleted or unsuitable for consumption. The hummingbird hawk-moth (Macroglossum stellatarum) migrates from Africa and southern Asia to Europe and northern Asia.

In southern India, mass migrations of many species occur before monsoons. As many as 250 species of butterflies in India are migratory. These include members of the Pieridae and Nymphalidae.

Many species Vanessa butterfly are also known to migrate. The Australian painted lady (Vanessa kershawi) periodically migrates down the coast of Australia, and occasionally, in periods of strong migration in Australia, migrate to New Zealand. The painted lady (Vanessa cardui) is a butterfly whose annual 15,000 km round trip from Scandinavia and Great Britain to West Africa involves up to six generations. The red admiral (Vanessa atalanta) periodically migrates from southern to northern Europe for the summer, although sometimes movement north is observed in early autumn.

The monarch butterfly, Danaus plexippus, migrates from southern Canada to wintering sites in central Mexico where they spend the winter. In the late winter or early spring, the adult monarchs leave the Transvolcanic mountain range in Mexico to travel north. Mating occurs and the females seek out milkweed to lay their eggs, usually first in northern Mexico and southern Texas. The caterpillars hatch and develop into adults that move north, where more offspring can go as far as Central Canada until the next migratory cycle. The entire annual migration cycle involves around five generations. More detailed information on this migration can be found under monarch butterfly migration.

== Orthoptera ==
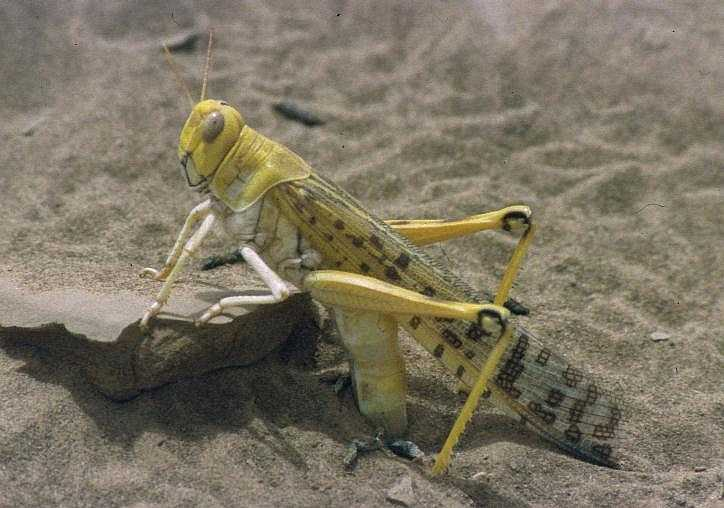
Locusts (Schistocerca gregaria) regularly migrate with the seasons.

Short-horned grasshoppers sometimes form swarms that will make long flights. These are often irregular and may be related to resource availability and thus not fulfilling some definitions of insect migration. There are however some populations of species such as locusts (Schistocerca gregaria) that make regular seasonal movements in parts of Africa; exceptionally, the species migrates very long distances, as in 1988 when swarms flew across the Atlantic Ocean.

== Odonata ==
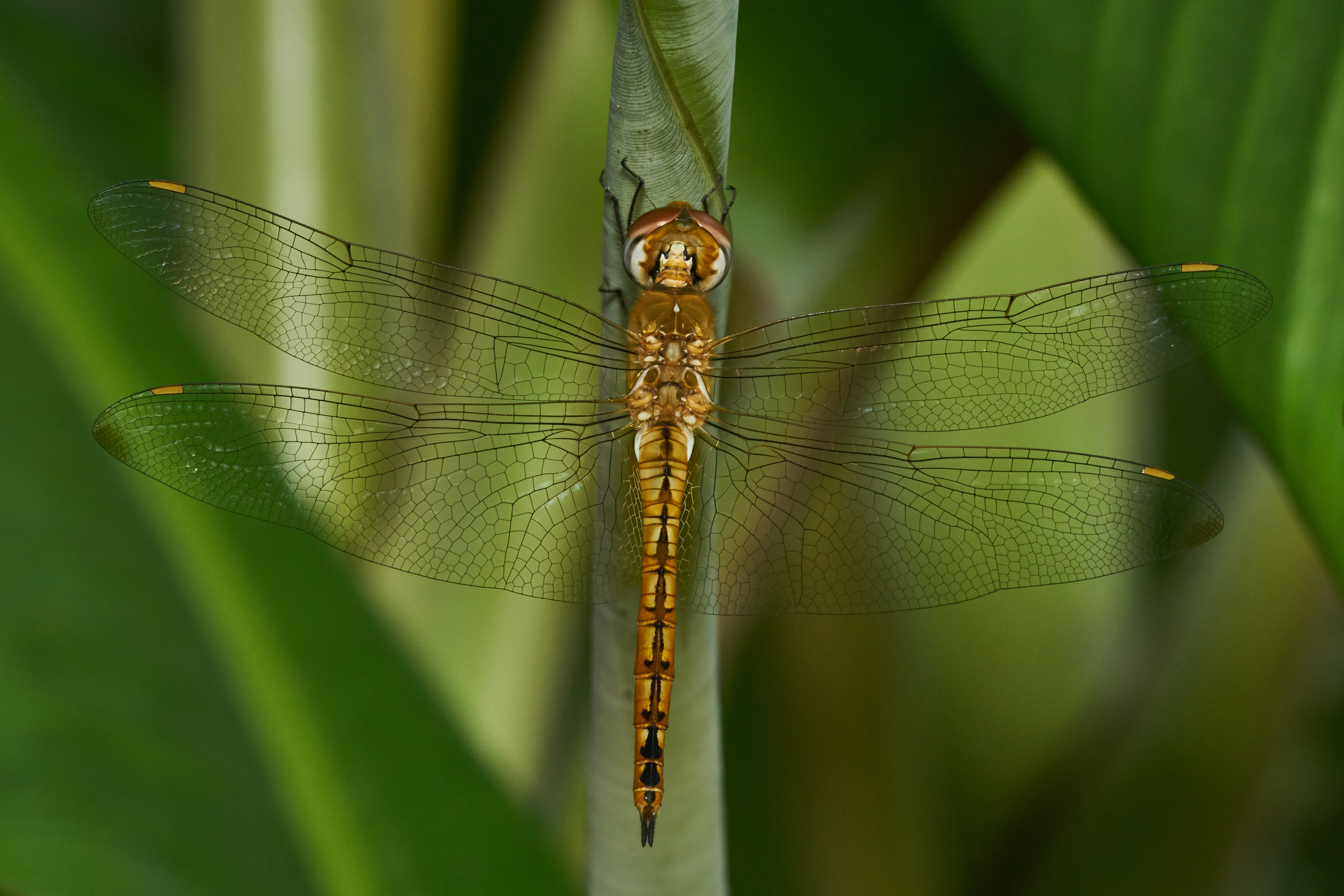
Pantala flavescens is the world's longest known distance travelling dragonfly

Dragonflies are among the longest distance insect migrants. Many species of Libellula, Sympetrum and Pantala are known for their mass migration. Pantala flavescens is thought to make the longest ocean crossings among insects, flying between India and Africa on their migrations. Their movements are often assisted by winds.

== Coleoptera ==
Ladybird beetles such as Hippodamia convergens, Adalia bipunctata and Coccinella undecimpunctata have been noted in large numbers in some places. In some cases, these movements appear to be made in the search for hibernation sites.

== Heteroptera ==
Some Oncopeltus fasciatus will journey from northern states and southern Canada to southern states; others will overwinter where they are. Murgantia histrionica relies on seasonal winds on the Mississippi valley for travel.

== Homoptera ==
Leafhoppers Macrosteles fascifrons and Empoasca fabae rely on seasonal winds on the Mississippi valley for travel.

== See also ==
- Animal migration
