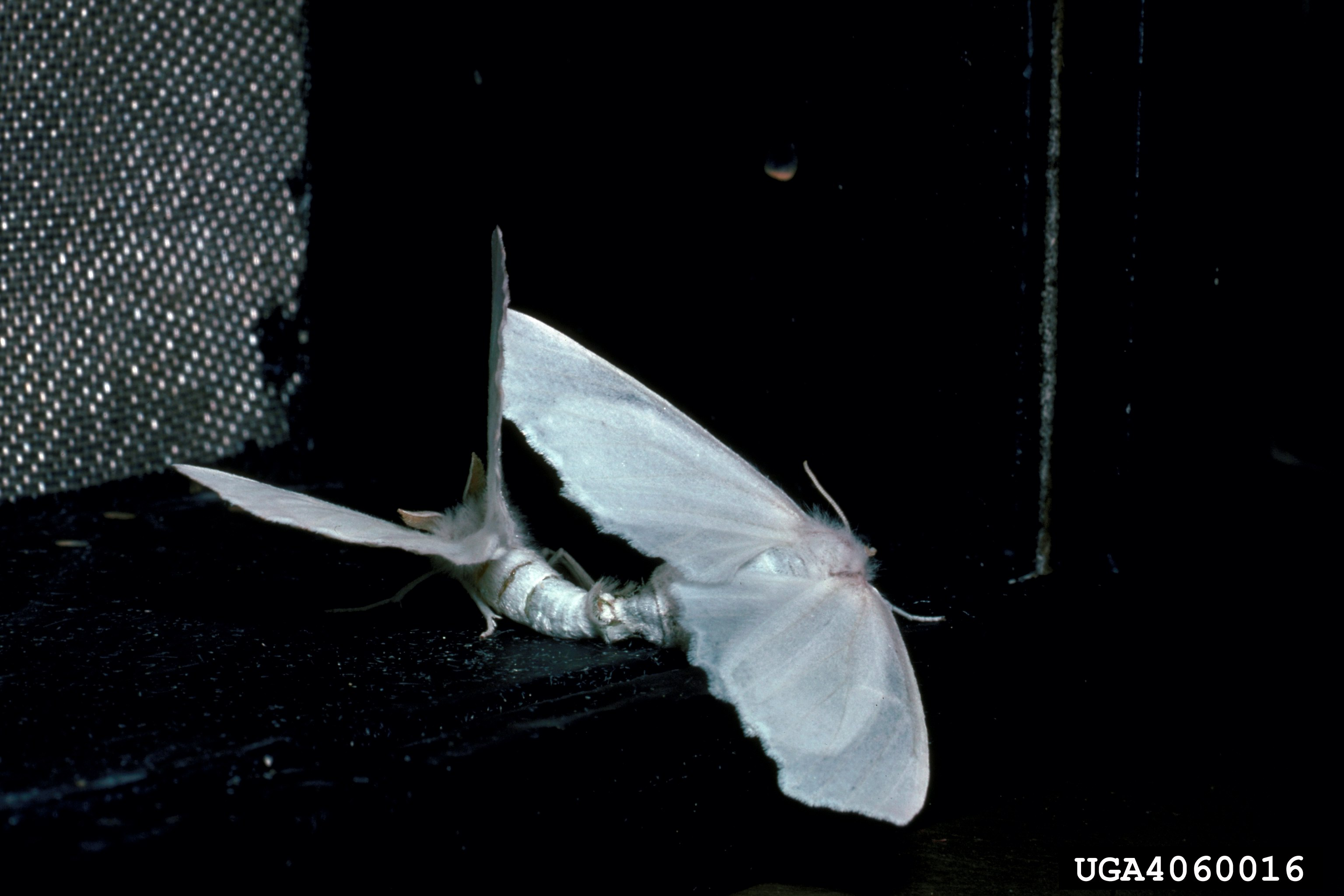
- Adults mating

Scientific classification
- Domain: Eukaryota
- Kingdom: Animalia
- Phylum: Arthropoda
- Class: Insecta
- Order: Lepidoptera
- Family: Geometridae
- Genus: Ennomos
- Species: E. subsignaria

Binomial name
- Ennomos subsignaria (Hübner, 1823)

Synonyms
- Eudalimia subsignaria Hübner, 1823; Ennomos niveosericeatus (Harris, 1855)

= Ennomos subsignaria =

Elm spanworm moth

Species of moth

Ennomos subsignaria, the elm spanworm moth, is a moth of the family Geometridae. The species was first described by Jacob Hübner in 1823. It is found in North America from Texas (south) to Alberta (northwest) and east to the Atlantic coast. It is recorded infrequently in Great Britain through accidental importation in asparagus.

The wingspan is 35–40 mm. They are on wing from late May to August. one generation per year.

The larvae feed on elm, apple, birch, maple, and oak.

== Gallery ==
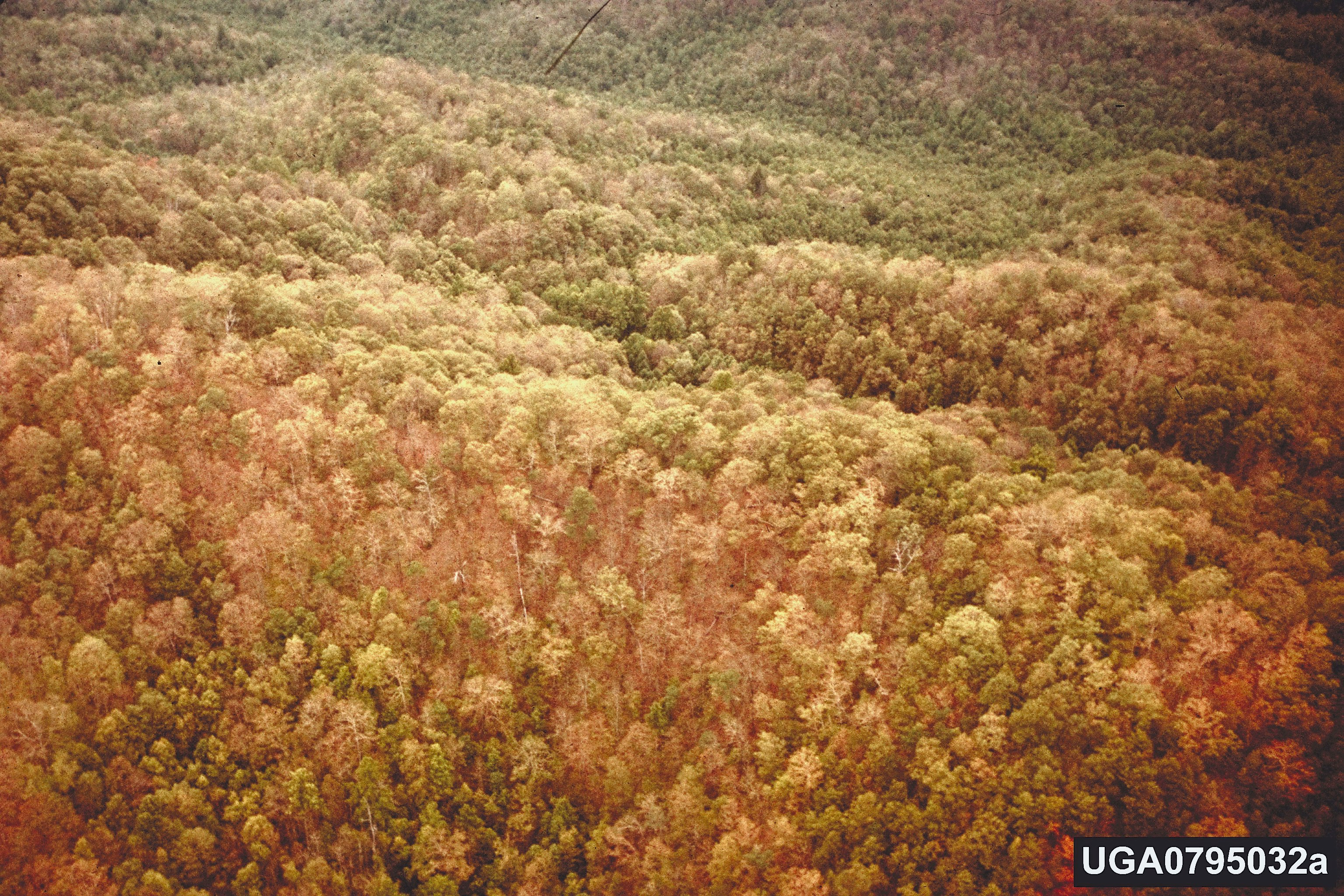
Infestation

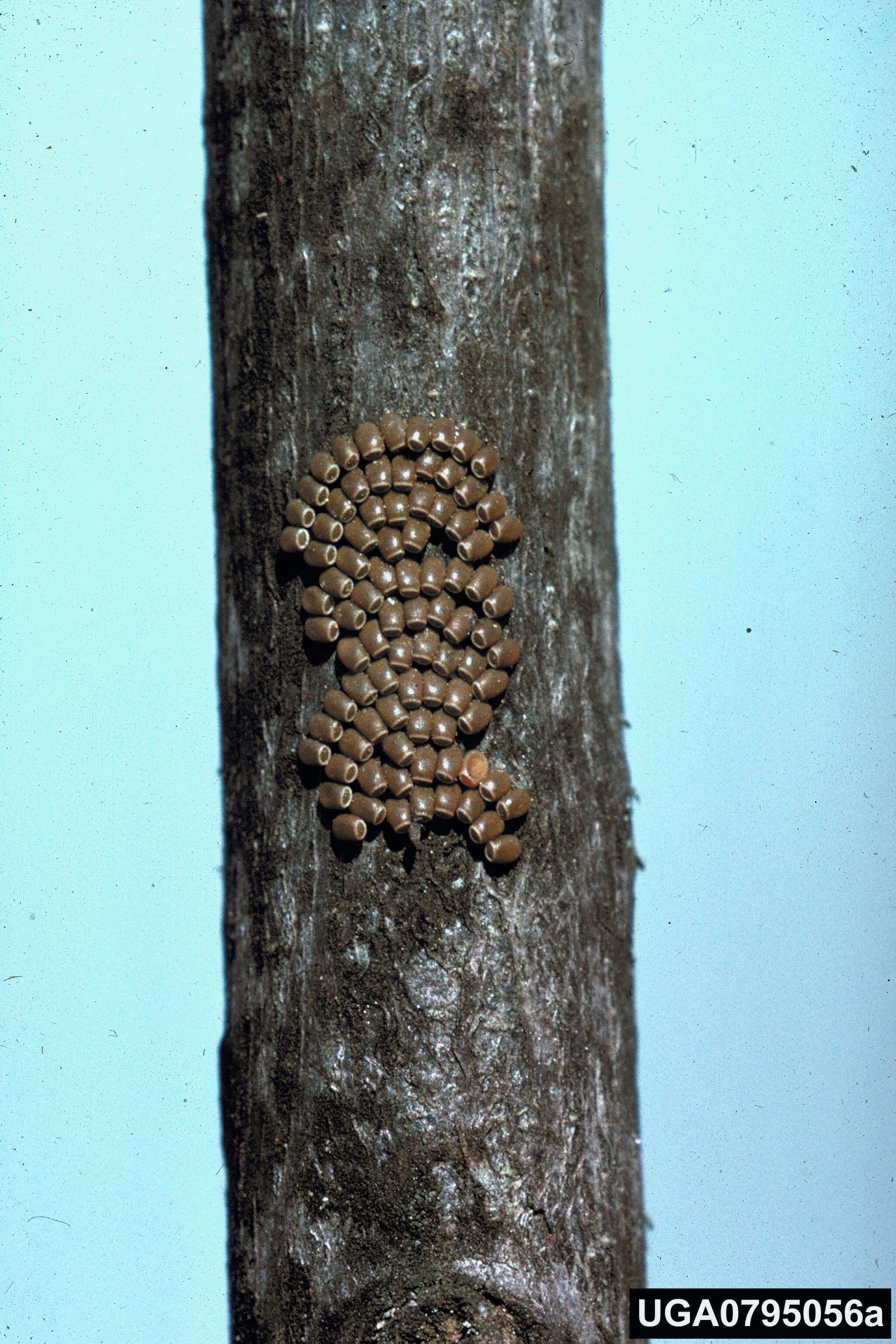
Eggs

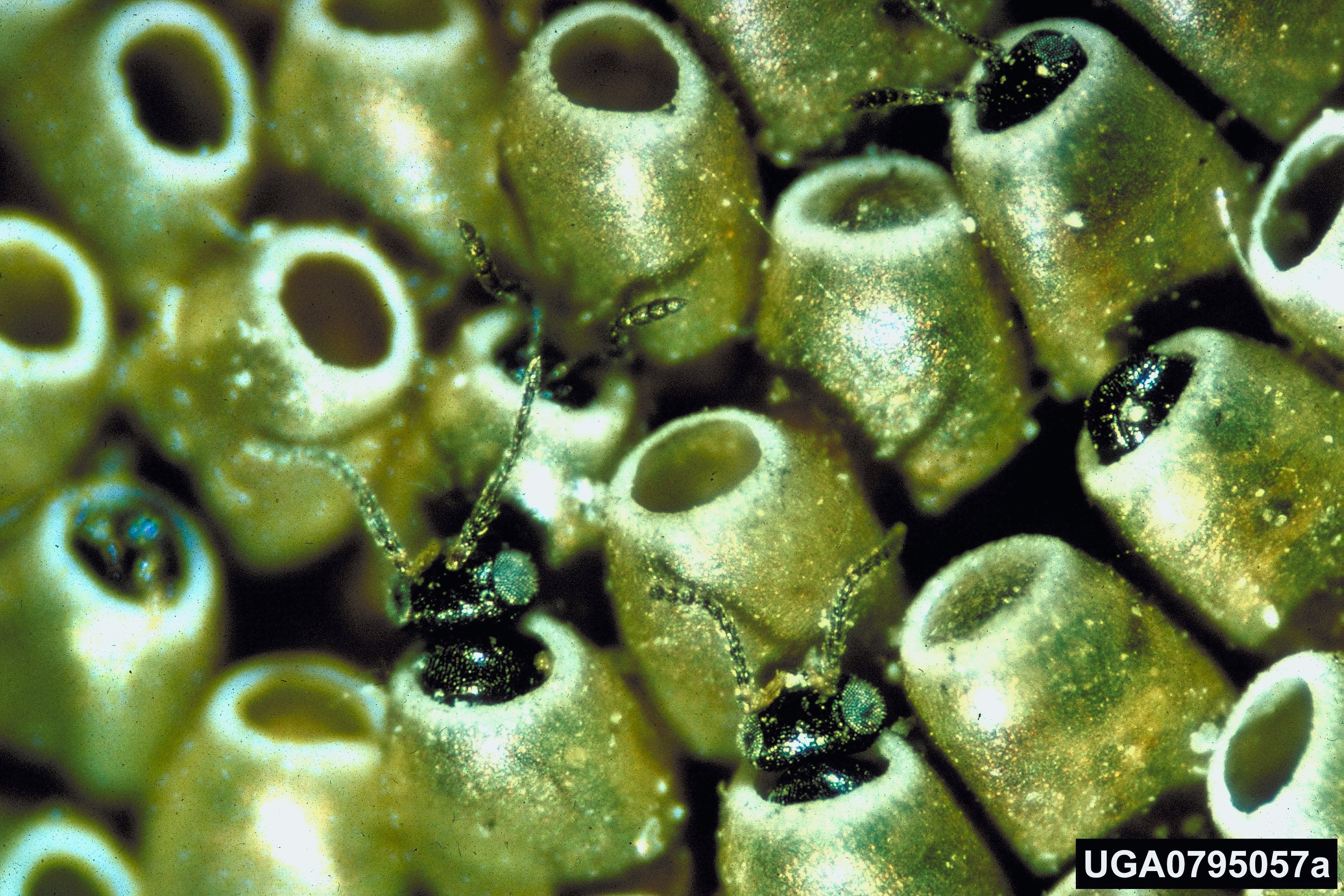
Eggs parasitised by Telenomus alsophilae

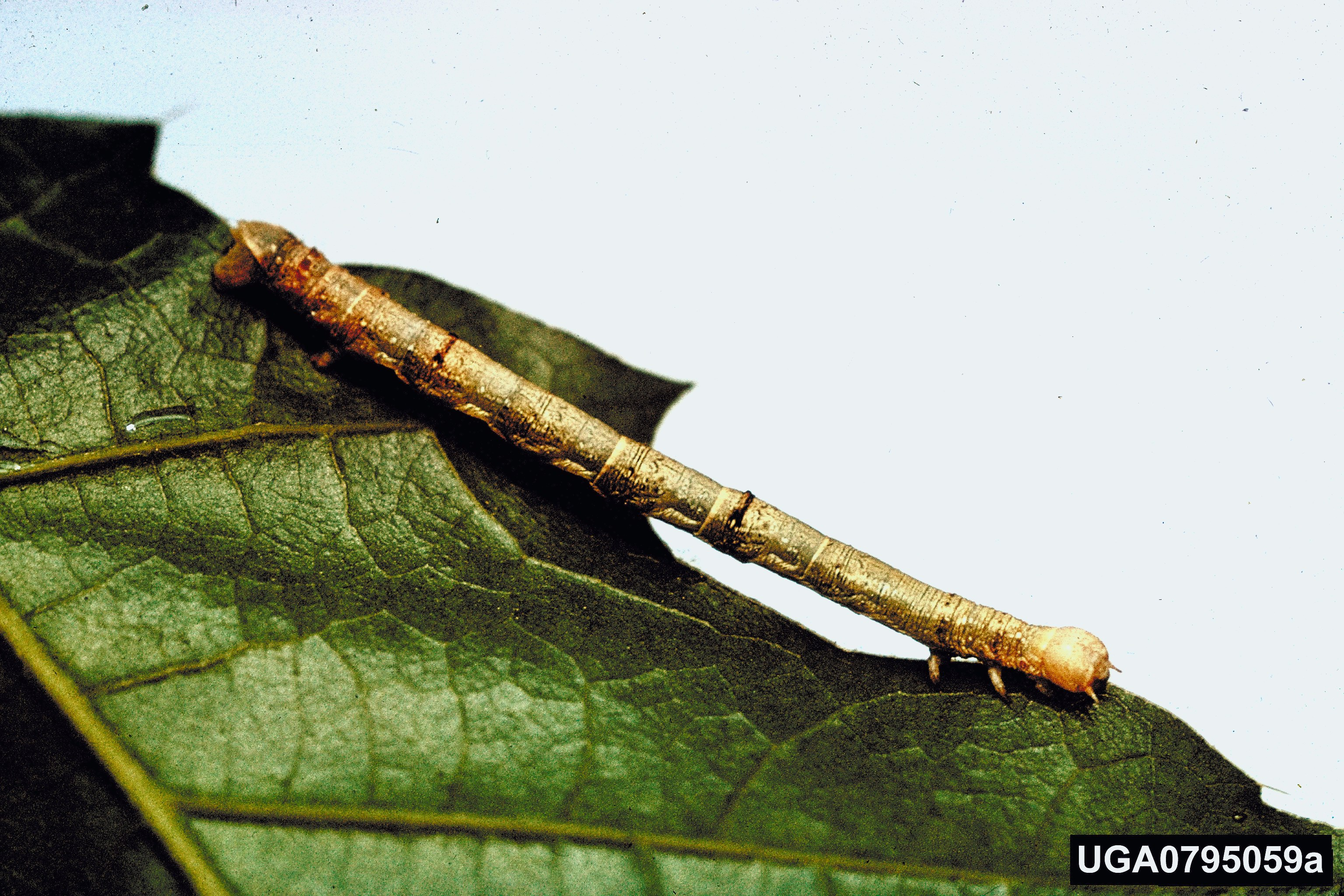
Larva

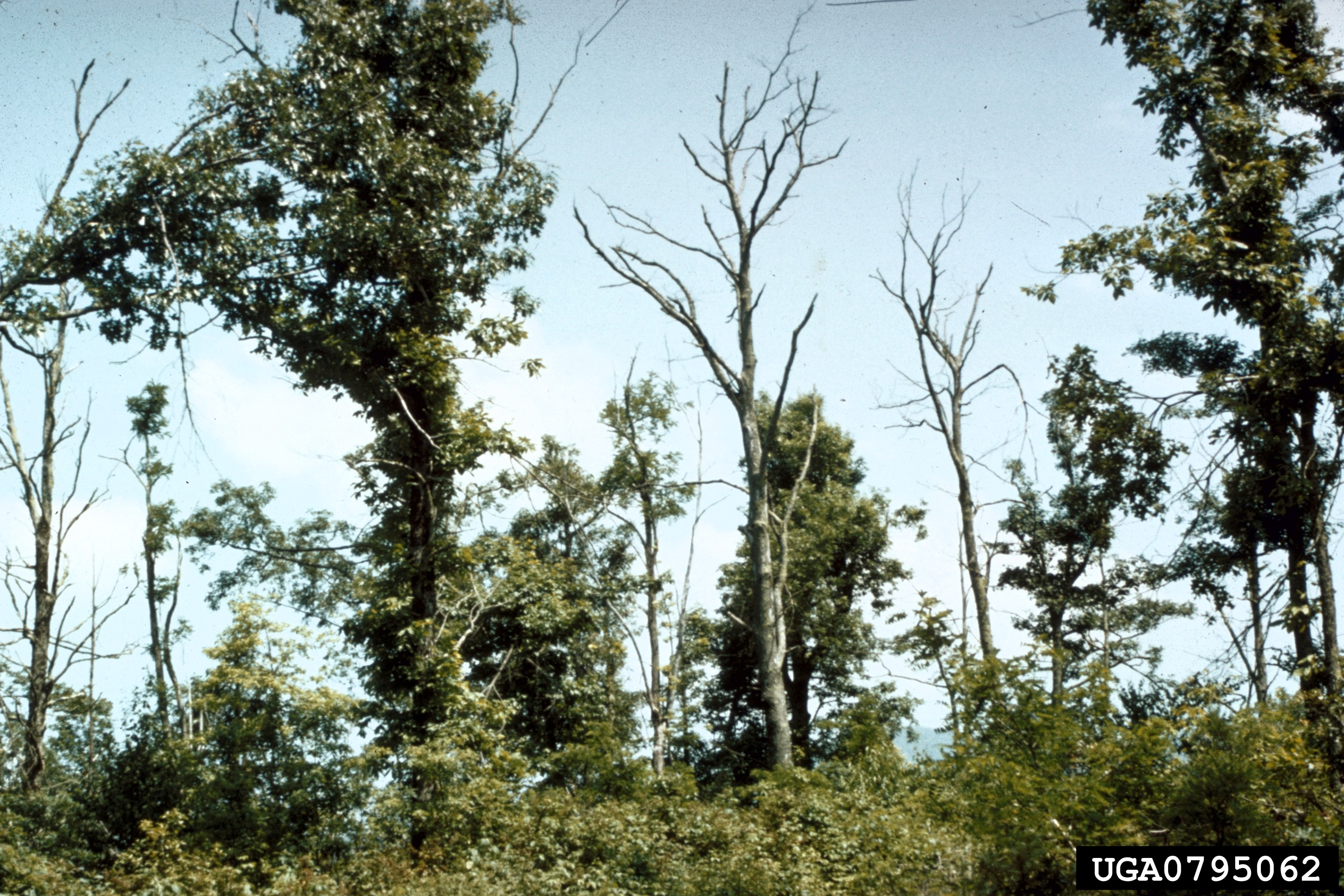
Damage

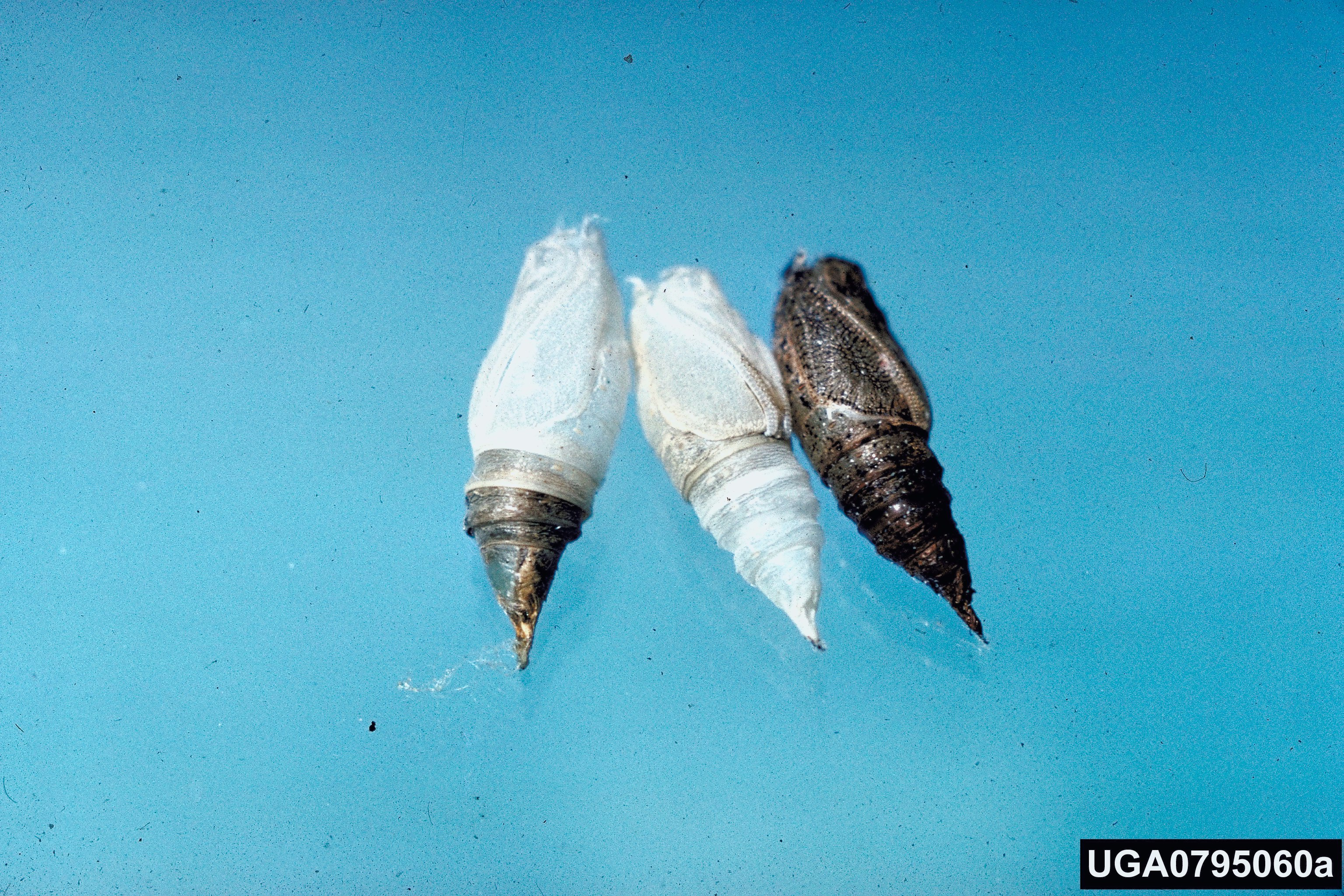
Pupae

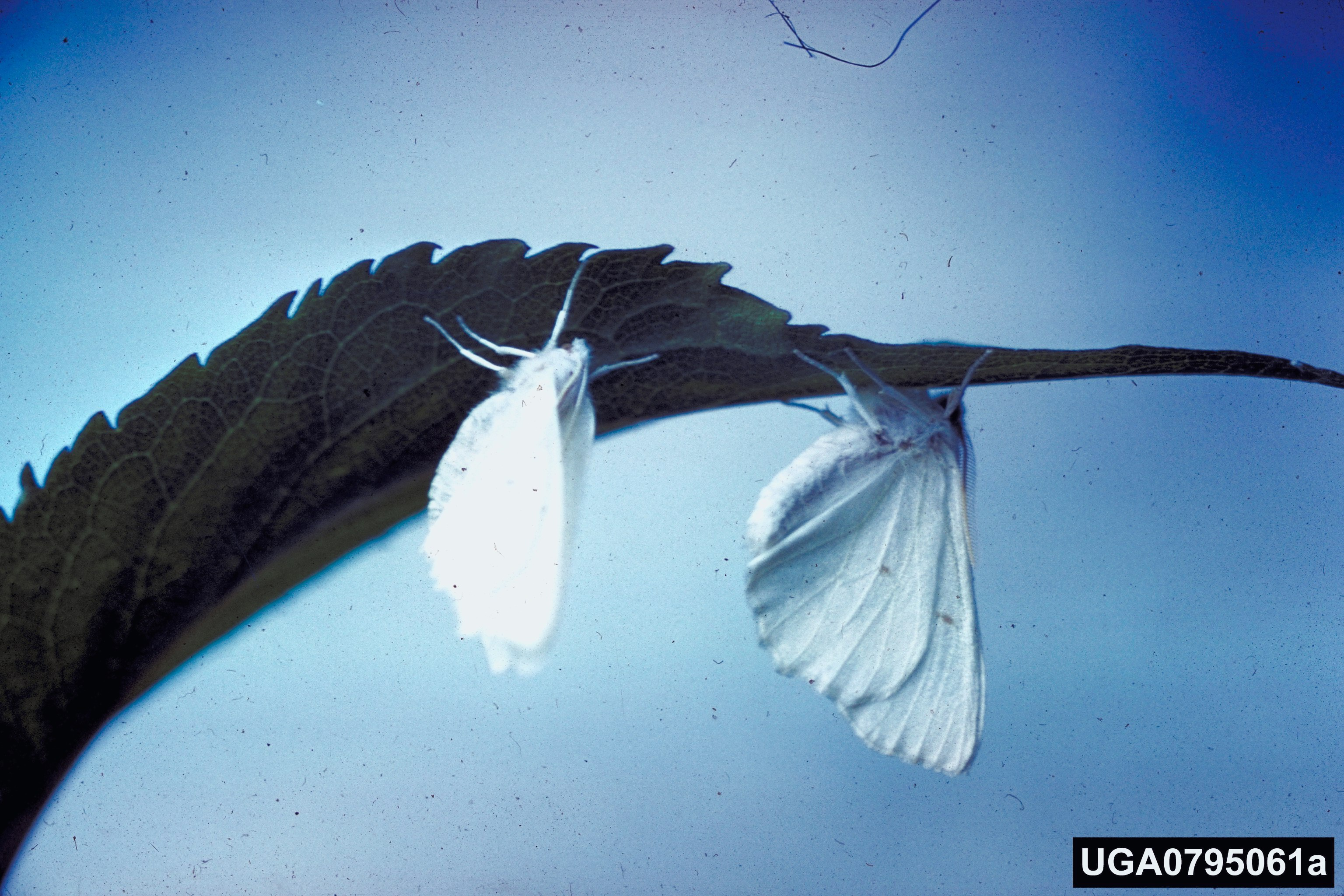
Adult
