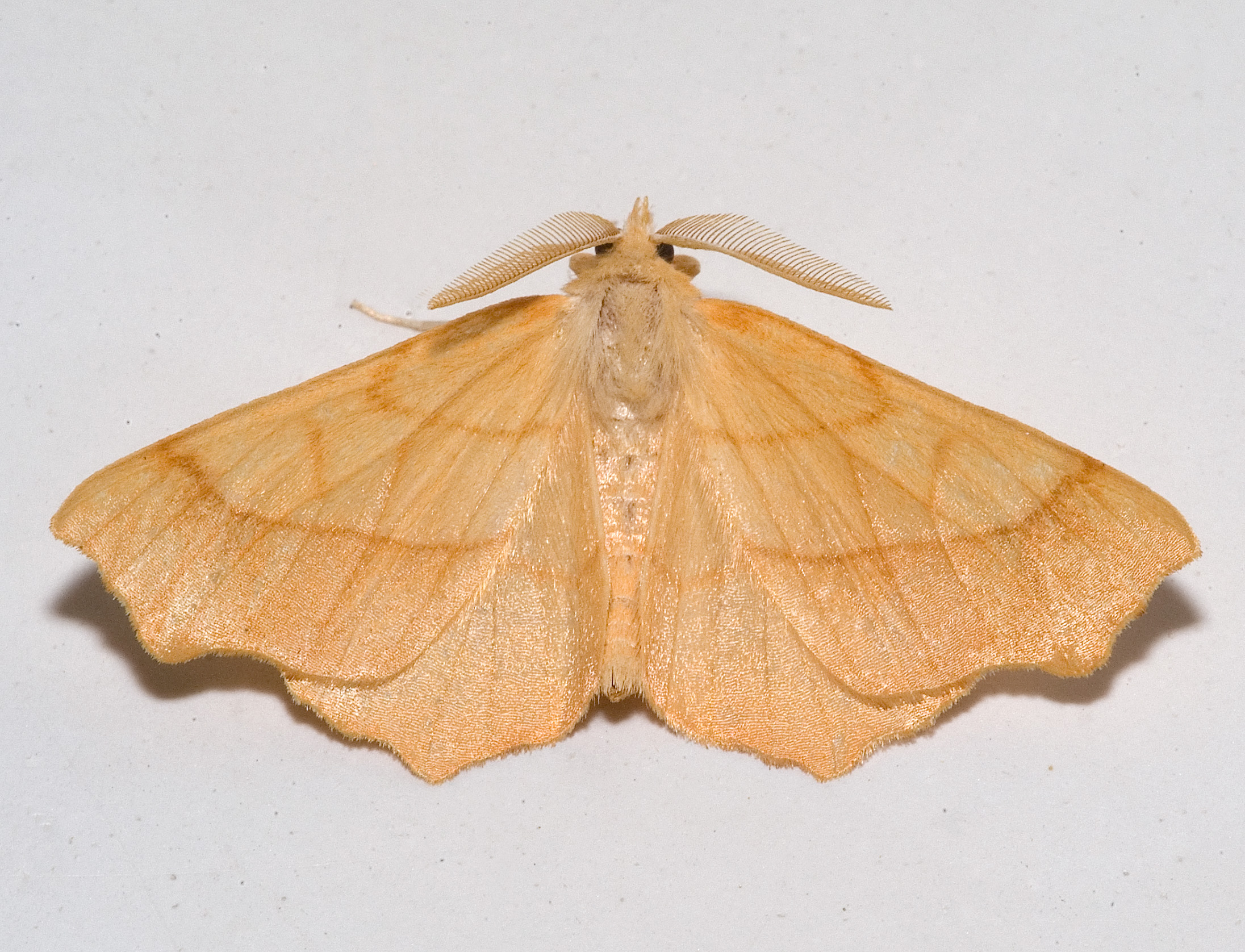

Scientific classification
- Kingdom: Animalia
- Phylum: Arthropoda
- Clade: Pancrustacea
- Class: Insecta
- Order: Lepidoptera
- Family: Geometridae
- Genus: Ennomos
- Species: E. quercinaria

Binomial name
- Ennomos quercinaria (Hufnagel, 1767)

= Ennomos quercinaria =

Species of moth

Ennomos quercinaria, the August thorn, is a moth of the family Geometridae. The species can be found in Europe. It was first described by Johann Siegfried Hufnagel in 1767.

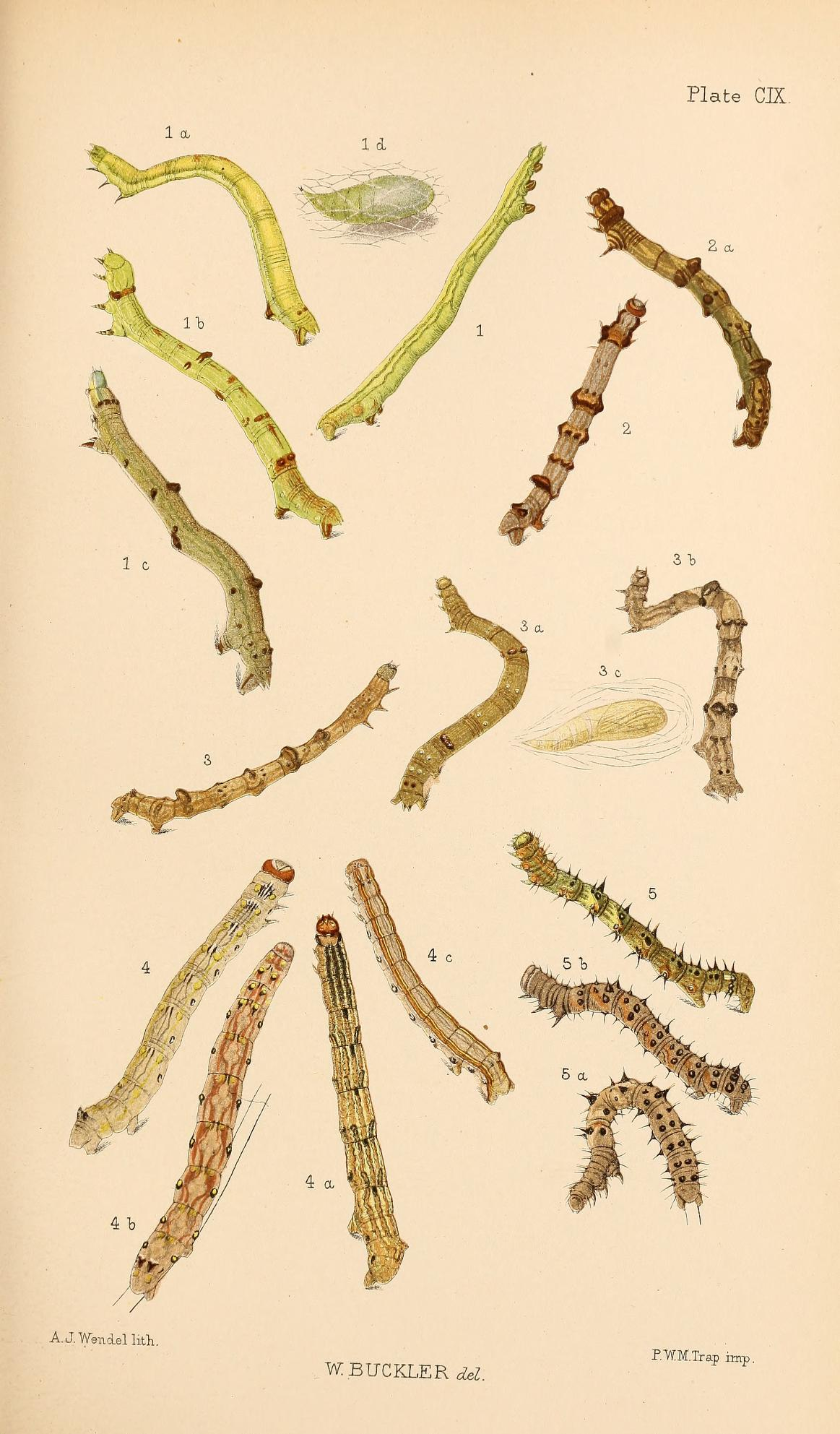
Figs. 3, 3a, 3b larva after final moult d pupa

== Description ==
The wingspan is 42–50 mm. The length of the forewings is 18–22 mm. The ground colour is orange yellow. The forewings are lightly or heavily speckled and have a dark marginal edge. Both forewings and hindwings are scalloped at the edges and have two cross lines. The discal spot is not always evident.

It is similar to Ennomos alniaria, but distinguished by the postmedian line (outer line) curving inwards towards the costa.

== Distribution ==
It is found in some but not all of western Europe, Belgium, The Netherlands, the Iberian Peninsula and to the east in Greece, Hungary, Romania, European Turkey, Ukraine and to the south, the Iberian Peninsula, Italy and Sicily.

== Biology ==
The moths fly in one generation from August to September.. They are attracted to light.

The caterpillars feed on oak and beech.

== Notes ==
1. The flight season refers to the British Isles. This may vary in other parts of the range.
