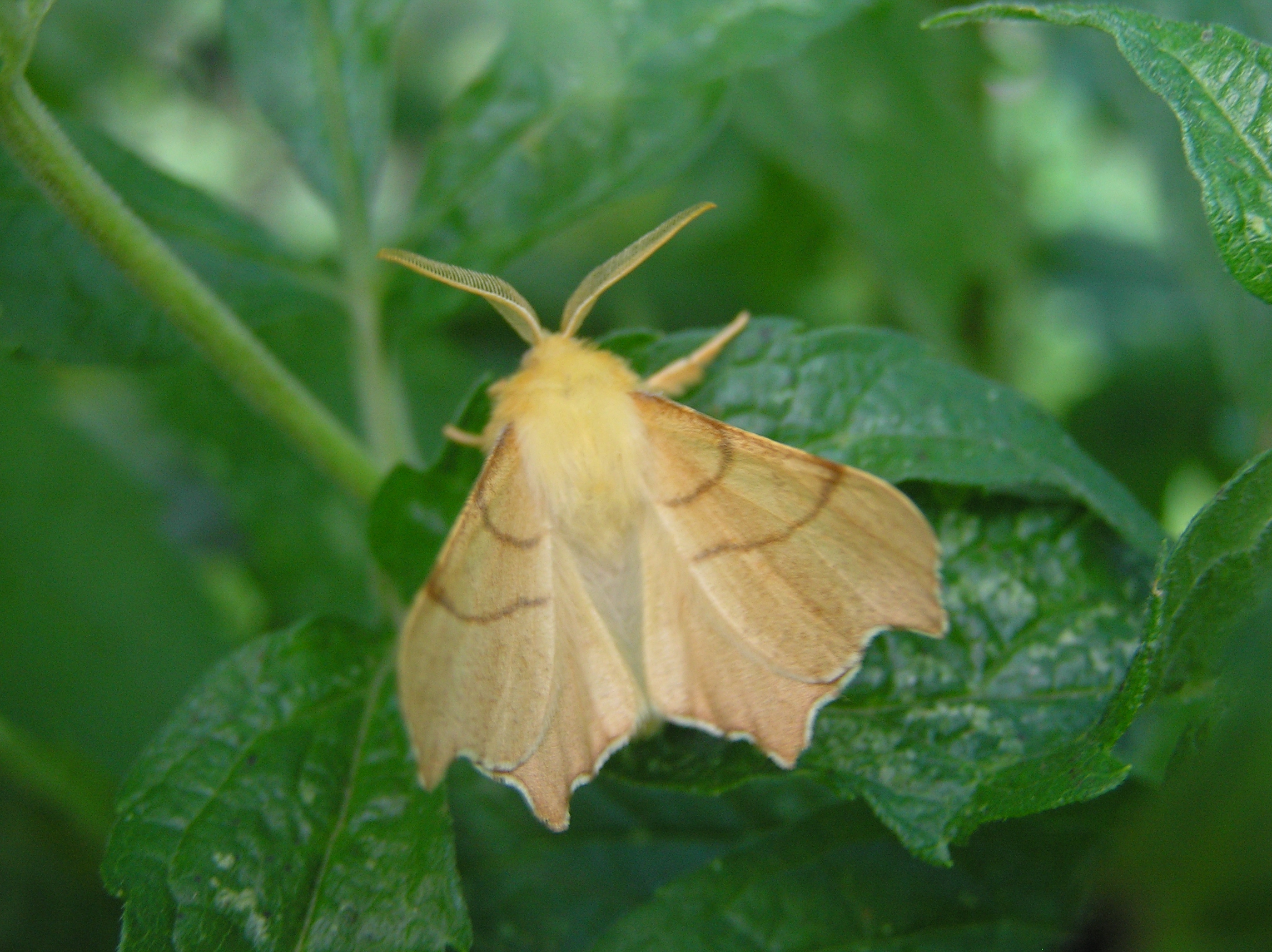

Scientific classification
- Kingdom: Animalia
- Phylum: Arthropoda
- Clade: Pancrustacea
- Class: Insecta
- Order: Lepidoptera
- Family: Geometridae
- Genus: Ennomos
- Species: E. erosaria

Binomial name
- Ennomos erosaria (Denis & Schiffermüller, 1775)

= Ennomos erosaria =

September thorn

Species of moth

Ennomos erosaria, the September thorn, is a moth of the family Geometridae. The species can be found in the Palearctic realm in western Europe and from central Scandinavia. Its range extends to the northern Mediterranean and east to the Caucasus and Russia. It is widespread in mixed and deciduous forests in Europe. The south eastern occurrence reaches Turkey and the Caucasus. The main habitat is dry deciduous forests and parks. In the Southern Alps, the species rises to an altitude of about 1600 metres.

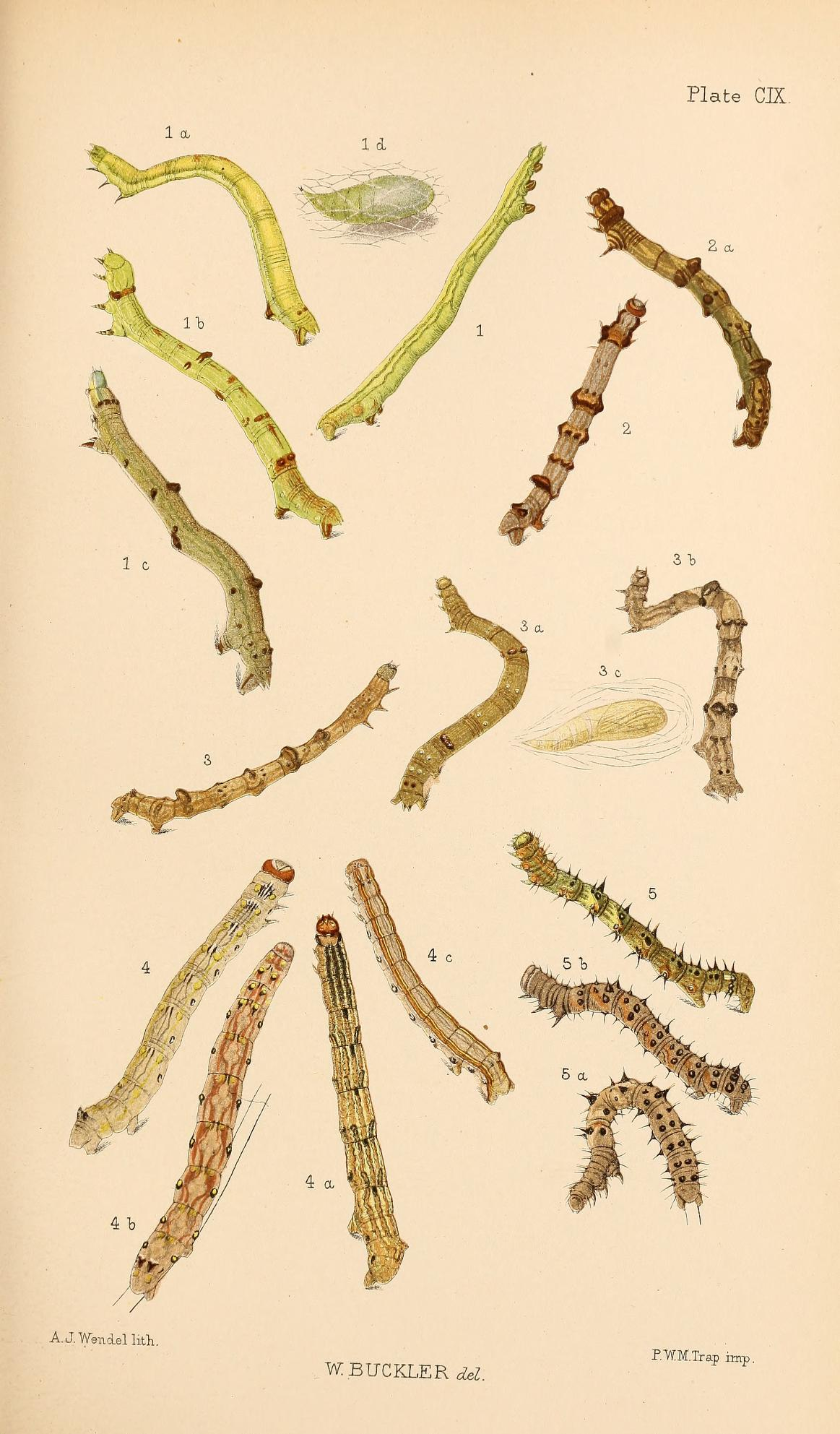
Figs. 2, 2a larva after final moult

The wingspan is 30–35 mm. The length of the forewings is 17–21 mm. The ground colour is straw yellow to ochre-yellow. The colour is darker on hindwing termen and the hindwing also has a faint discal spot. The fasciae (bands) are brown. The inward arc under projection on distal forewing is prominent. The name typical form is yellowish. ab. tiliaria Hbn. is paler, the forewing straw-colour. — ab. tinicoloria Esp. is without the transverse lines.

Similar species: other Ennomos species.

The moths fly in one generation from July to October. They are attracted to light.

The larva which is rather elongate, with strong knob-shaped protuberances, altogether bearing a remarkable likeness to an oak twig is brown, now with a tinge of purple, now of greenish, the ventral surface paler greenish brown. It feeds on oak, birch, and lime.

== Notes ==
1. The flight season refers to the British Isles. This may change in other parts of the range.
