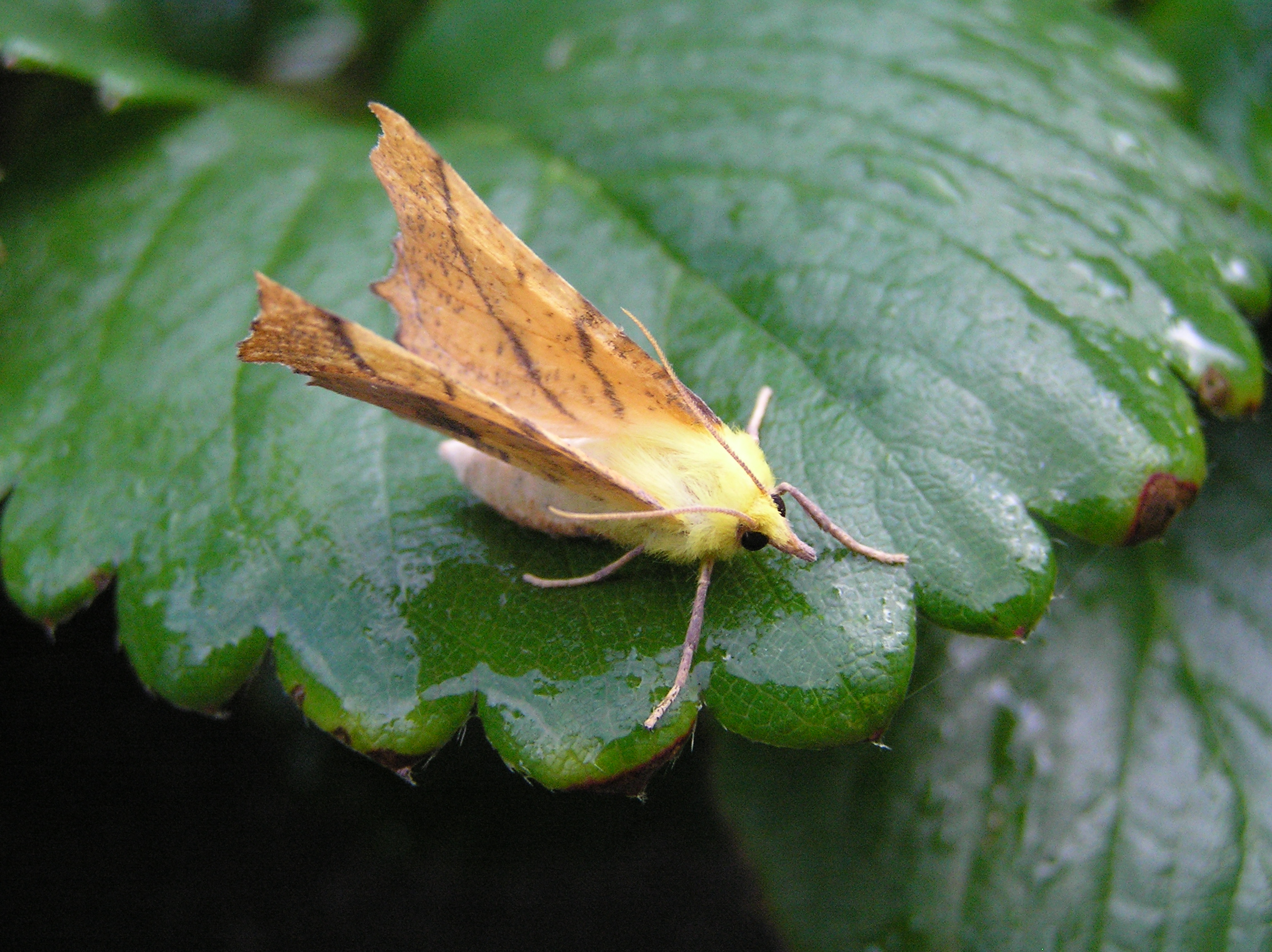

Scientific classification
- Kingdom: Animalia
- Phylum: Arthropoda
- Class: Insecta
- Order: Lepidoptera
- Family: Geometridae
- Genus: Ennomos
- Species: E. alniaria

Binomial name
- Ennomos alniaria (Linnaeus, 1758)

= Ennomos alniaria =

Canary-shouldered thorn

Species of moth

Ennomos alniaria, the canary-shouldered thorn, is a moth of the family Geometridae. The species was first described by Carl Linnaeus in his 1758 10th edition of Systema Naturae. It can be found in Europe in a wide variety of biotopes where there are deciduous trees, perhaps mostly in deciduous forests and gardens.

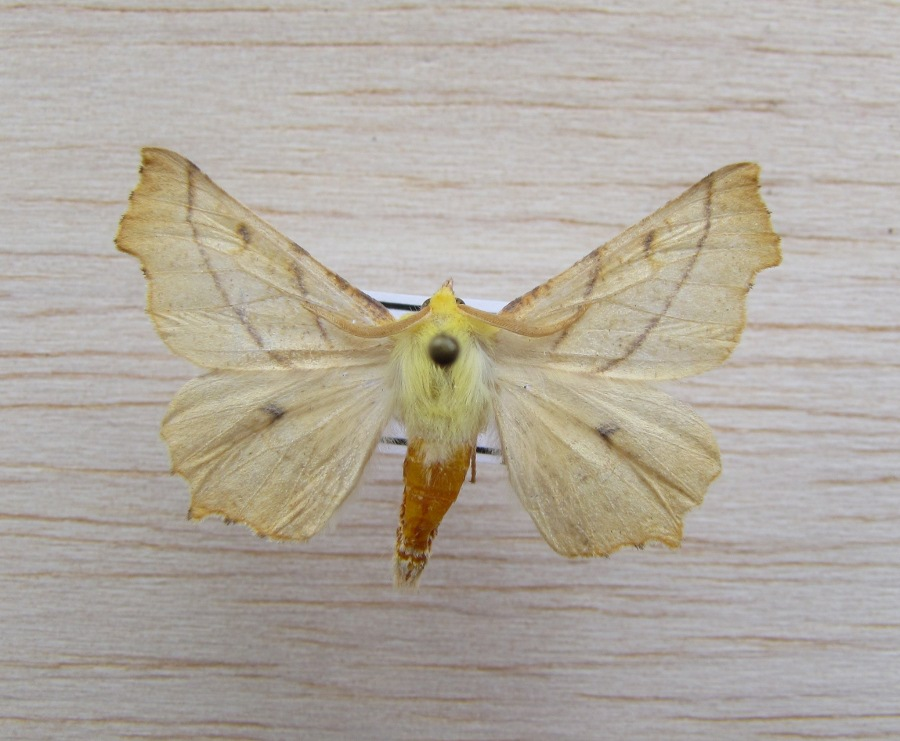
Museum specimen

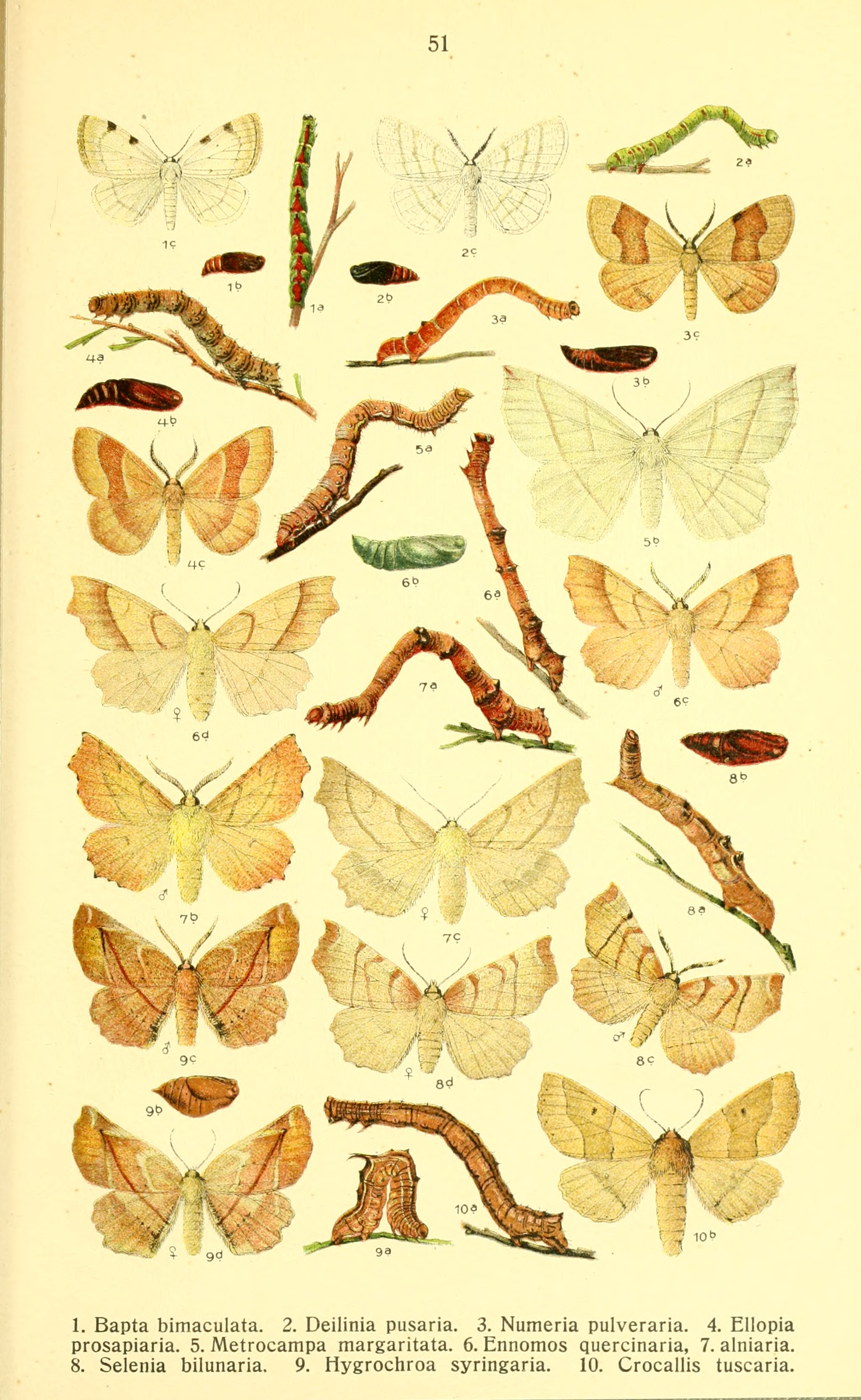
Figure 7 shows male, female and larva Die Schmetterlinge Deutschlands mit besonderer Berücksichtigung ihrer Biologie, Bd. 1-4, by Karl Eckstein

== Description ==
The wingspan is 34–42 mm. The length of the forewings is 16–20 mm. Resembles Ennomos quercinaria, but has a canary-yellow thorax. The forewings are scalloped and there are also two cross lines. The wings are ochre yellow with greyish flecks. The bands, a small discal spot on the forewing and a larger discal spot on the hindwing are grey. The larva is brownish-grey, long and thin, with four raised cross-bands on the dorsal side. It closely resembles a dead twig.

Other Ennomos species are similar.

== Distribution ==
Caucasus and Russia to western Europe. The northern limit is Fennoscandia and the southern limit is the northern Mediterranean. It has also been introduced into British Columbia.

== Biology ==
The moths fly in one generation from July to October. They are attracted to light.

The larvae feed on a number of deciduous trees including downy birch and silver birch, alder and goat willow.

== Notes ==
1. The flight season refers to the British Isles. This may vary in other parts of the range.
