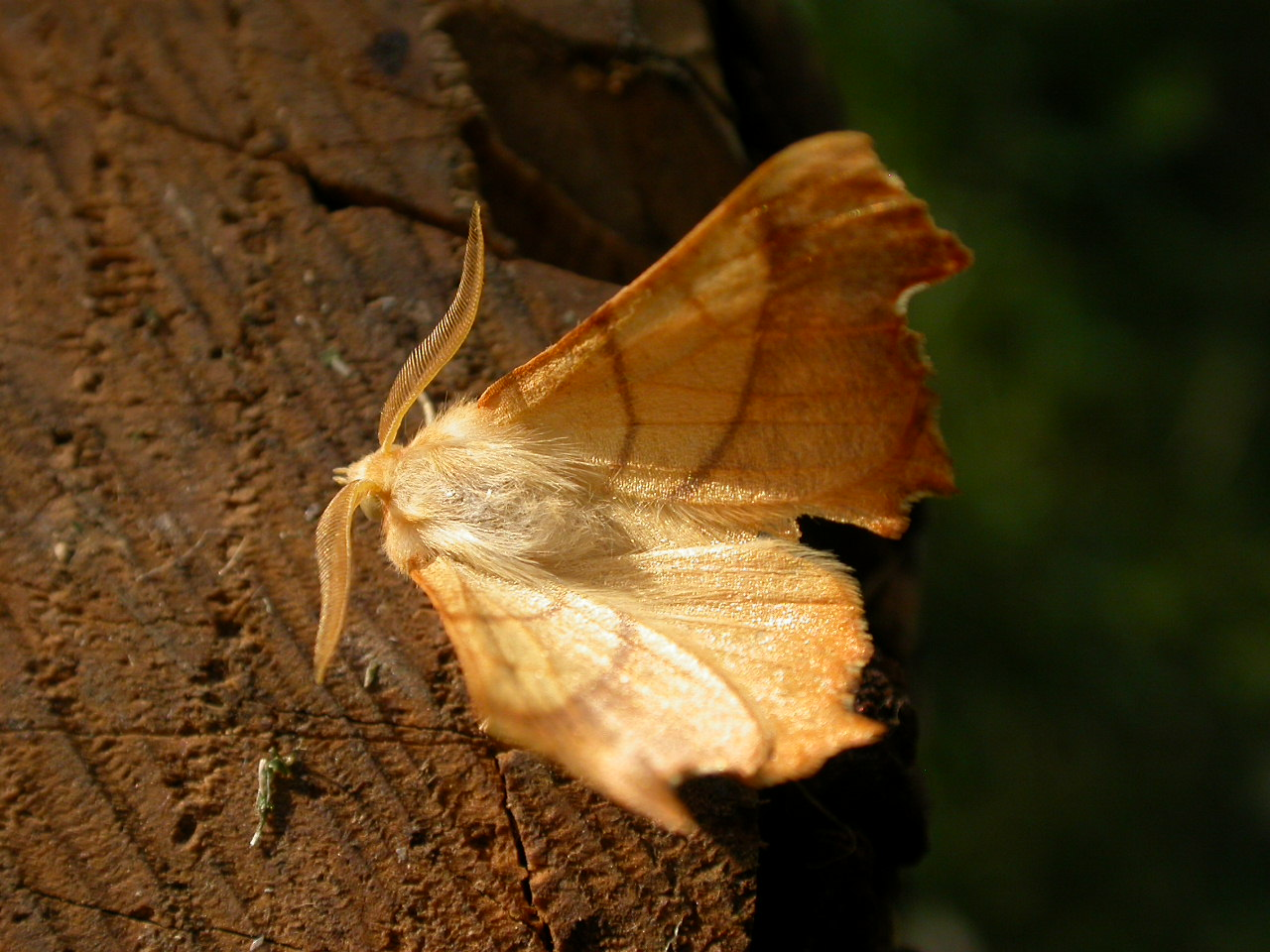

Scientific classification
- Kingdom: Animalia
- Phylum: Arthropoda
- Clade: Pancrustacea
- Class: Insecta
- Order: Lepidoptera
- Family: Geometridae
- Genus: Ennomos
- Species: E. fuscantaria

Binomial name
- Ennomos fuscantaria (Haworth, 1809)

= Ennomos fuscantaria =

Species of moth

Ennomos fuscantaria, the dusky thorn, is a moth of the family Geometridae. The species can be found in the western part of the Palearctic realm in western Europe and from central Scandinavia its range extends to the northern Mediterranean and east to Russia.

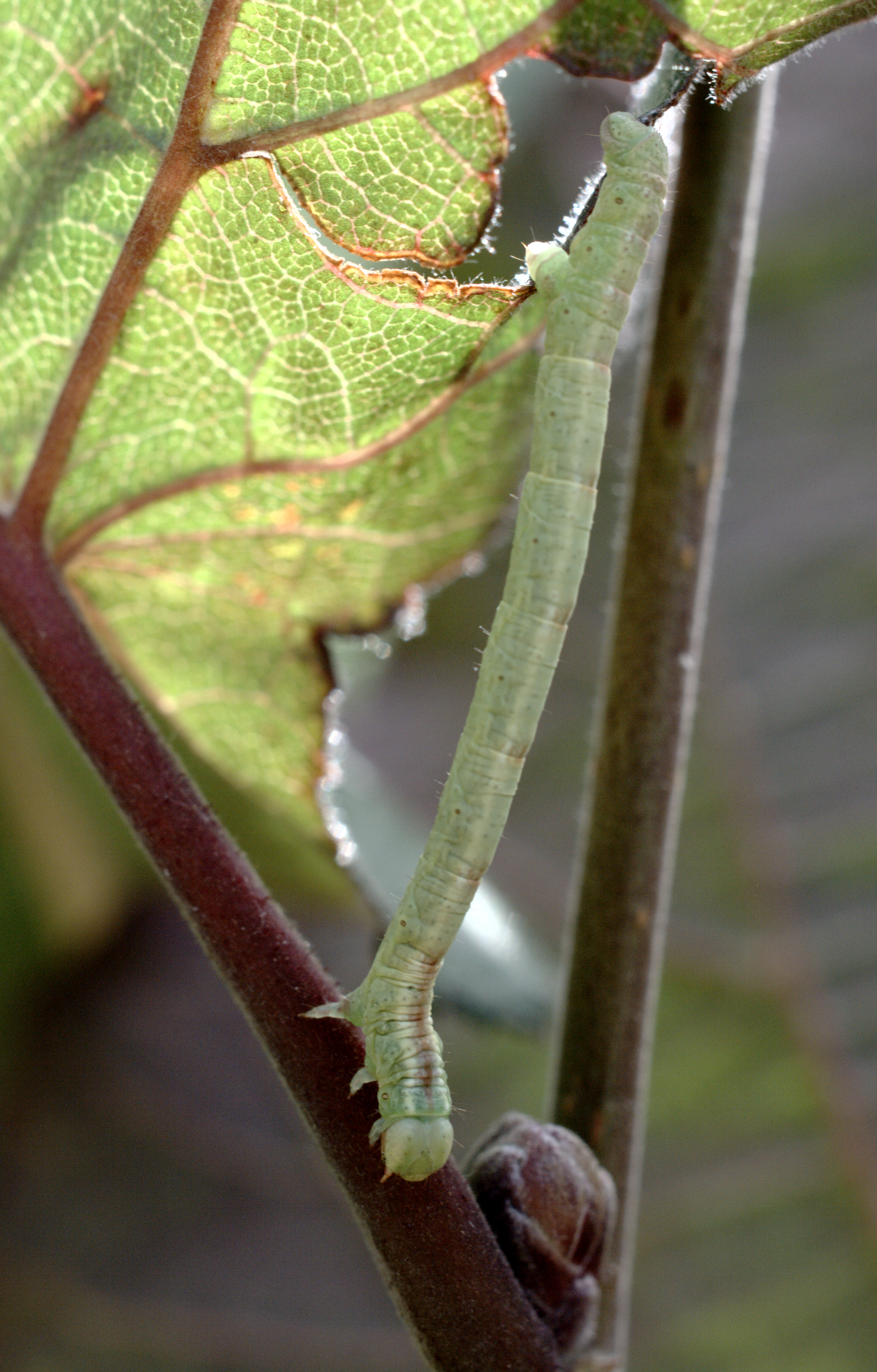
Caterpillar

The wingspan is 35–40 mm. The ground colour is ochre yellow. There are violet-grey flecks on the forewing and an oblong discal spot. The fasciae (bands) are grey brown. On the hindwing the grey brown transverse line hides a small discal spot.

Other Ennomos species are similar.

The moth is on wing from July to October depending on the location.

The caterpillars feed on ash (Fraxinus excelsior), but also privet (Ligustrum species) and other shrubs.
