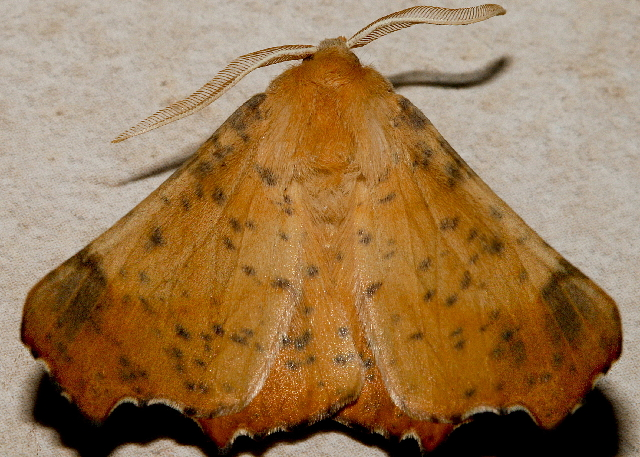

Scientific classification
- Kingdom: Animalia
- Phylum: Arthropoda
- Class: Insecta
- Order: Lepidoptera
- Family: Geometridae
- Genus: Ennomos
- Species: E. magnaria

Binomial name
- Ennomos magnaria Guenée, [1858]

Synonyms
- Ennomos lutaria Walker, 1866; Ennomos ochreatus Hulst, 1898

= Ennomos magnaria =

Maple spanworm moth

Species of moth

Ennomos magnaria, the maple spanworm moth, notched wing moth, notched-wing geometer or notch-wing moth, is a moth of the family Geometridae. The species was first described by Achille Guenée in 1858. It is found from coast to coast in southern Canada and the northern United States, south in the east to Florida and Louisiana and in the west to California.

The wingspan is 43–60 mm. Adults resemble an autumn leaf. Adults are on wing from July to early November in one generation per year. Adults are nocturnal and may rest on buildings during the day.

The larvae feed on the leaves of Alnus, Fraxinus, Tilia, Betula, Ulmus, Carya, Acer, Quercus, and Populus species.
