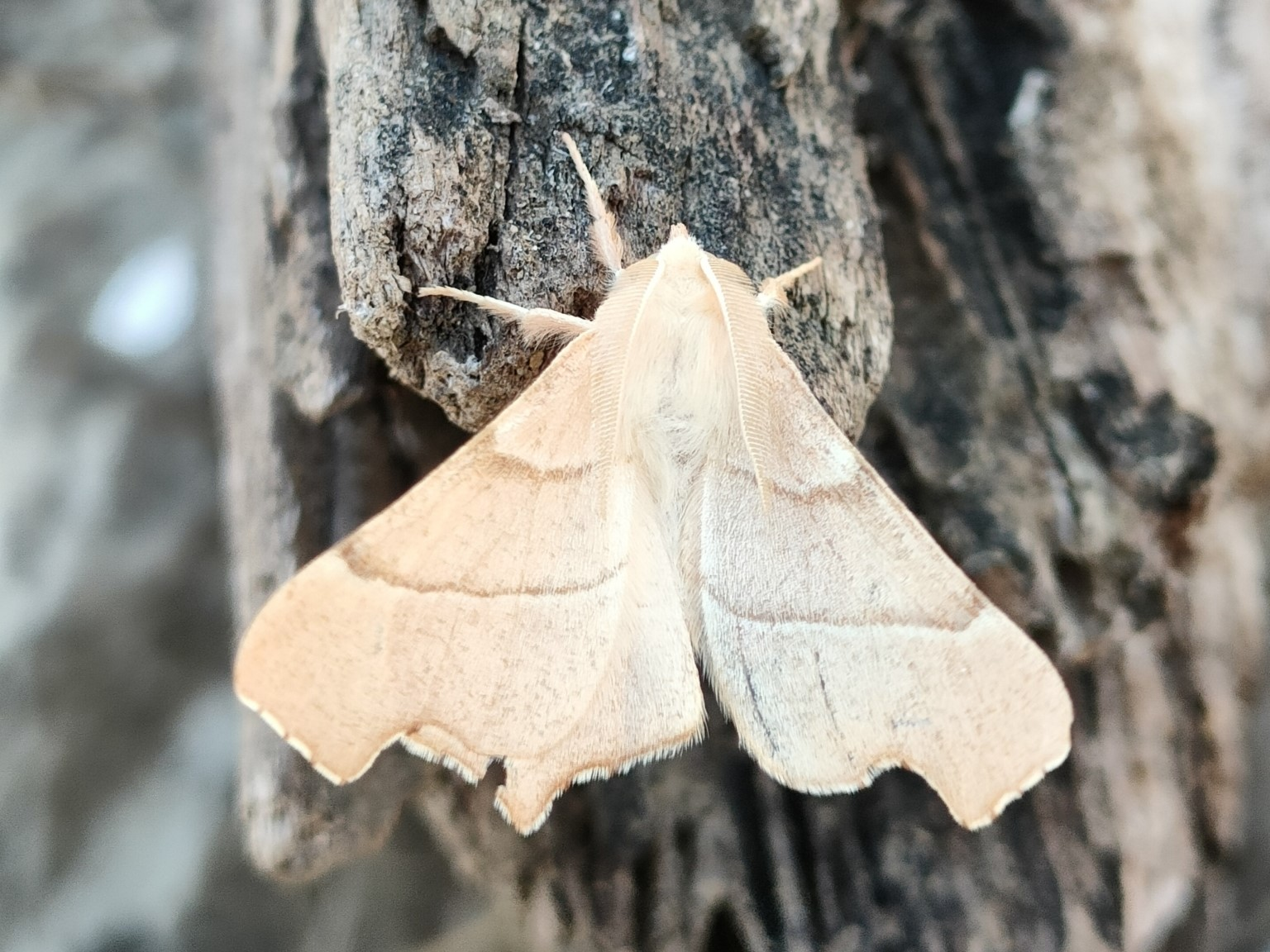

Scientific classification
- Domain: Eukaryota
- Kingdom: Animalia
- Phylum: Arthropoda
- Class: Insecta
- Order: Lepidoptera
- Family: Geometridae
- Genus: Ennomos
- Species: E. quercaria

Binomial name
- Ennomos quercaria (Hübner, 1813)

Synonyms
- Geometra quercaria Hubner, 1813; Eugonia angularia Denis & Schiffermüller, 1775; Ennomos carpinaria Hübner, 1799

= Ennomos quercaria =

Clouded August thorn

Species of moth

Ennomos quercaria, the clouded August thorn, is a species of moth in the family Geometridae. The species was first described by Jacob Hübner in 1813. It is mostly found in southern Europe. There are two dubious records from Britain, one in the 19th century, then again in south-east England in 1992.

The wingspan is 28–35 mm. Adults are on wing from June to September.

The larvae feed on various species of oak.
