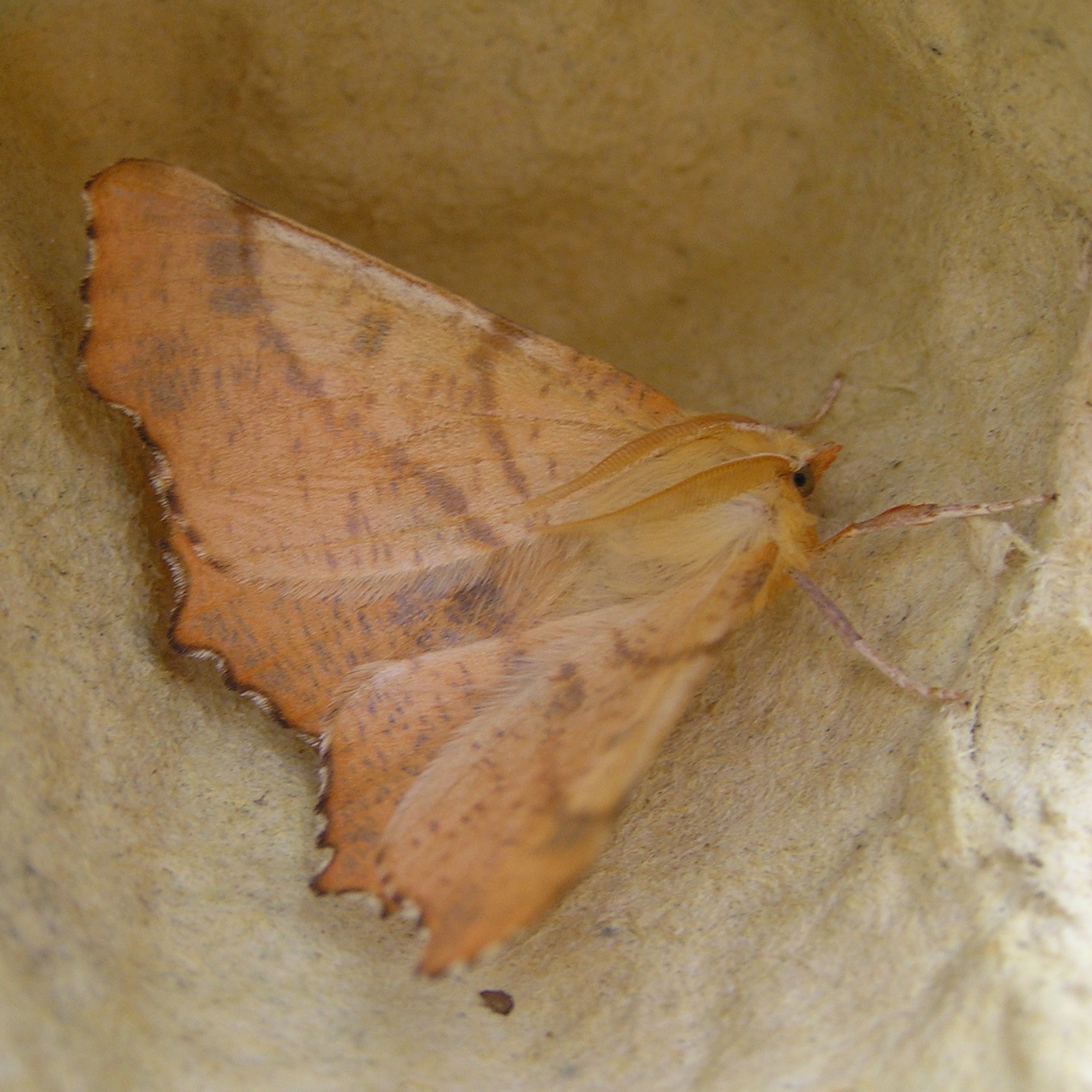

Scientific classification
- Kingdom: Animalia
- Phylum: Arthropoda
- Clade: Pancrustacea
- Class: Insecta
- Order: Lepidoptera
- Family: Geometridae
- Genus: Ennomos
- Species: E. autumnaria

Binomial name
- Ennomos autumnaria (Werneburg, 1859)

= Ennomos autumnaria =

Large thorn

Species of moth

Ennomos autumnaria, the large thorn, is a moth of the family Geometridae. The species can be found in Western and Central Europe East to Russia and Siberia

The wingspan is 40–50 mm. The length of the forewings is 21–28 mm. The ground colour is brown, red-brown or yellow-brown to yellowish beige. The forewing edge is scalloped and the forewing is marked with yellow and dark brown lines. The thorax is yellow to light brown. The antennae of the male are pectinate. The caterpillar is light yellowish-brown to reddish. It is up to 50 mm long. On segment five there few humps and on segment nine two long protrusions. It resembles a dead twig.

Similar species: other Ennomos.

Biotopes: Forest edges, parks, gardens with trees.

The moths fly in one generation from September to October. They are attracted to light.

The caterpillars feed on a number of deciduous trees.(Quercus sp., Alnus sp., Prunus sp., Salix sp., Tilia sp., Malus sp., Populus sp., Acer sp., Betula sp., Ulmus sp.).

== Notes ==
1. The flight season refers to the British Isles. This may vary in other parts of the range.
