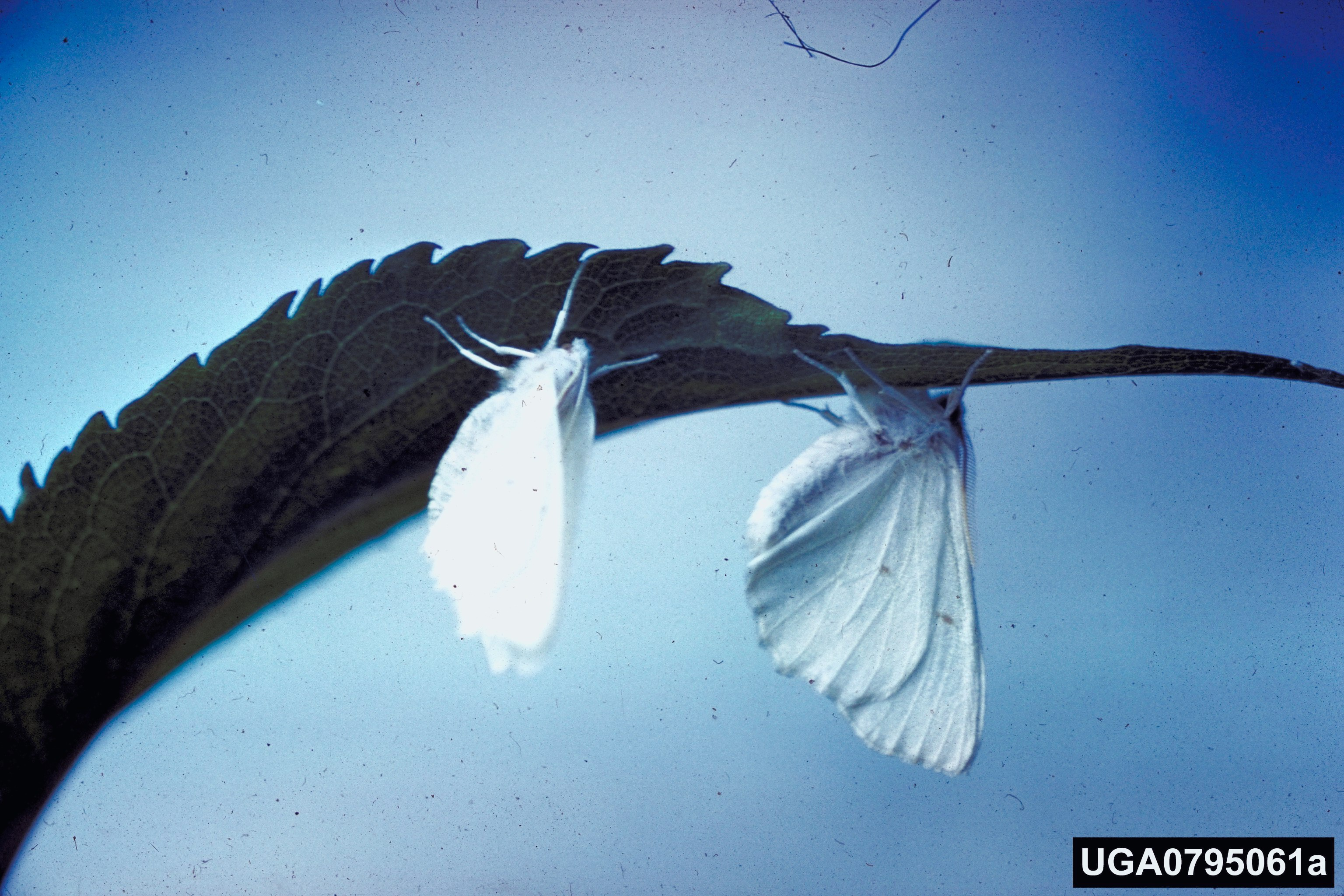
- Ennomos subsignaria adults

Scientific classification
- Domain: Eukaryota
- Kingdom: Animalia
- Phylum: Arthropoda
- Class: Insecta
- Order: Lepidoptera
- Family: Geometridae
- Tribe: Ennomini
- Genus: Ennomos; Treitschke, 1825

= Ennomos =

Genus of moths

Ennomos is a genus of moths in the family Geometridae erected by Georg Friedrich Treitschke in 1825.

== Species ==
- Ennomos alniaria (Linnaeus, 1758) – canary-shouldered thorn
- Ennomos autumnaria (Werneburg, 1859) – large thorn
- Ennomos effractaria (Freyer, 1842)
- Ennomos erosaria (Denis & Schiffermüller, 1775) – September thorn
- Ennomos fraxineti Wiltshire, 1947
- Ennomos fuscantaria (Haworth, 1809) – dusky thorn
- Ennomos infidelis Prout, 1929
- Ennomos magnaria Guenée, 1857 – maple spanworm, notched wing, notched-wing geometer, or notch-wing moth
- Ennomos quercaria (Hübner, 1813) – clouded August thorn
- Ennomos quercinaria (Hufnagel, 1767) – August thorn
- Ennomos subsignaria (Hübner, 1823) – elm spanworm
