= List of moths of Australia (Notodontidae) =

Partial list of Australian moths

This is a list of the Australian moth species of the family Notodontidae. It also acts as an index to the species articles and forms part of the full List of moths of Australia.

== Notodontinae ==
- Allata indistincta (Rothschild, 1917)
- Antimima corystes Turner, 1931
- Antimima cryptica Turner, 1917
- Antithemerastis acrobela (Turner, 1922)
- Archigargetta amydra (Turner, 1903)
- Cascera bella Bethune-Baker, 1904
- Cascera muscosa Walker, 1865
- Cerura australis Scott, 1864
- Cerura multipunctata Bethune-Baker, 1904
- Commonia hesychima (Turner, 1922)
- Destolmia lineata Walker, 1855
- Ecnomodes sagittaria (T.P. Lucas, 1900)
- Gallaba basinipha Turner, 1931
- Gallaba duplicata Walker, 1865
- Gallaba dysthyma Turner, 1931
- Gallaba eugraphes Turner, 1922
- Gallaba ochropepla Turner, 1903
- Gallaba subviridis Turner, 1941
- Gargettiana punctatissima (Bethune-Baker, 1916)
- Hobartina amblyiodes (Turner, 1931)
- Hobartina eusciera (Turner, 1931)
- Hylaeora capucina R. Felder, 1874
- Hylaeora caustopis Tepper, 1890
- Hylaeora dilucida R. Felder, 1874
- Hylaeora eucalypti Doubleday, 1849
- Lasioceros aroa Bethune-Baker, 1904
- Neola semiaurata Walker, 1855
- Neostauropus viridissimus (Bethune-Baker, 1904)
- Netria viridescens Walker, 1855
- Omichlis hadromeres Turner, 1922
- Omichlis hampsoni Bethune-Baker, 1904
- Ortholomia moluccana C. Felder, 1861
- Paradestolmia nigrolinea (T.P. Lucas, 1895)
- Phalera amboinae C. Felder, 1861
- Pheraspis mesotypa Turner, 1903
- Pheraspis polioxutha Turner, 1903
- Pheraspis rectilinea Turner, 1941
- Pheraspis spodea Turner, 1903
- Pheraspis symmetra Turner, 1917
- Pheressaces cycnoptera (Lower, 1894)
- Polychoa glauca (Turner, 1936)
- Polychoa styphlopis Turner, 1906
- Porsica acarodes (Turner, 1903)
- Psalidostetha banksiae (Lewin, 1805)
- Scythrophanes stenoptera Turner, 1926
- Sorama bicolor Walker, 1855
- Syntypistis chloropasta Turner, 1907
- Syntypistis opaca Turner, 1922
- Syntypistis viridigriseus (Rothschild, 1917)
- Teleclita dryinopa (Dodd, 1902)
- Timoraca meeki (Rothschild, 1917)

== Pygaerinae ==
- Clostera rubida (H. Druce, 1901)

== Thaumetopoeinae ==
- Aglaosoma periblepta (Turner, 1922)
- Aglaosoma variegata (Walker, 1855)
- Axiocleta perisema Turner, 1911
- Cynosarga ornata Walker, 1865
- Epicoma anisozyga Turner, 1922
- Epicoma argentata (Walker, 1865)
- Epicoma argentosa (T.P. Lucas, 1890)
- Epicoma asbolina Turner, 1902
- Epicoma barnardi (T.P. Lucas, 1890)
- Epicoma barytima Turner, 1917
- Epicoma chrysosema Turner, 1922
- Epicoma contristis Hübner, 1823
- Epicoma derbyana Strand, 1929
- Epicoma dispar Turner, 1922
- Epicoma melanospila (Wallengren, 1860)
- Epicoma melanosticta (Donovan, 1805)
- Epicoma phoenura Turner, 1922
- Epicoma pontificalis Rosenstock, 1885
- Epicoma protrahens (T.P. Lucas, 1890)
- Epicoma signata (Walker, 1855)
- Epicoma tristis (Donovan, 1805)
- Epicoma zelotes Turner, 1902
- Mesodrepta harpotoma Turner, 1924
- Ochrogaster lunifer Herrich-Schäffer, 1855
- Tanystola isabella (White, 1841)
- Tanystola ochrogutta (Herrich-Schäffer, 1856)
- Trichiocercus mesomelas (Walker, 1855)
- Trichiocercus sparshalli (Curtis, 1830)
