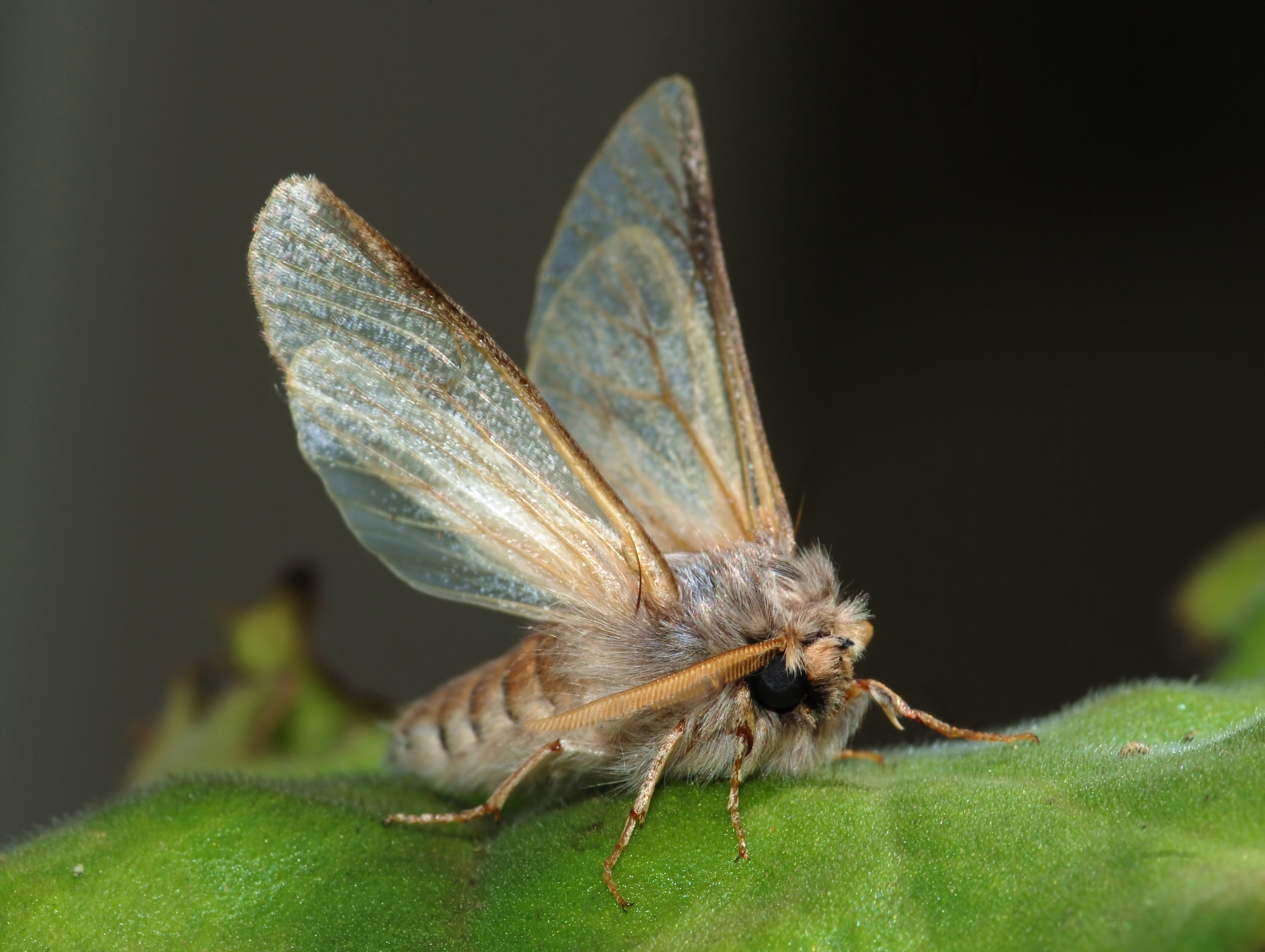
- A male pine processionary moth (Thaumetopoea pityocampa)

Scientific classification
- Kingdom: Animalia
- Phylum: Arthropoda
- Clade: Pancrustacea
- Class: Insecta
- Order: Lepidoptera
- Superfamily: Noctuoidea
- Family: Notodontidae
- Subfamily: Thaumetopoeinae; Aurivillius, 1889

= Thaumetopoeinae =

Subfamily of moths

Thaumetopoeinae is a subfamily of moths in the family Notodontidae. This group is sometimes treated as a family Thaumetopoeidae with three subfamilies: Thaumetopoeinae, Anaphinae and Epicominae. However, it is now commonly treated at subfamily rank based on morphological and molecular phylogenetic evidence.

The etymology of the subfamily name derives from the Ancient Greek words θαυματόεις (thaumatóeis, 'marvelous') and ποιέω (poiéō, 'to do') and literally means showing beautiful things. This explains why the name is sometimes spelled Thaumatopoeinae, incorrectly from the taxonomic standpoint, but in accordance with etymology.

The larval stage of some Thaumetopoeinae are known as processionary caterpillars, so named because they move in columns in search of food, resembling a procession. Some of the species, like the pine and oak processionaries, can constitute a health hazard due to their urticating hairs.

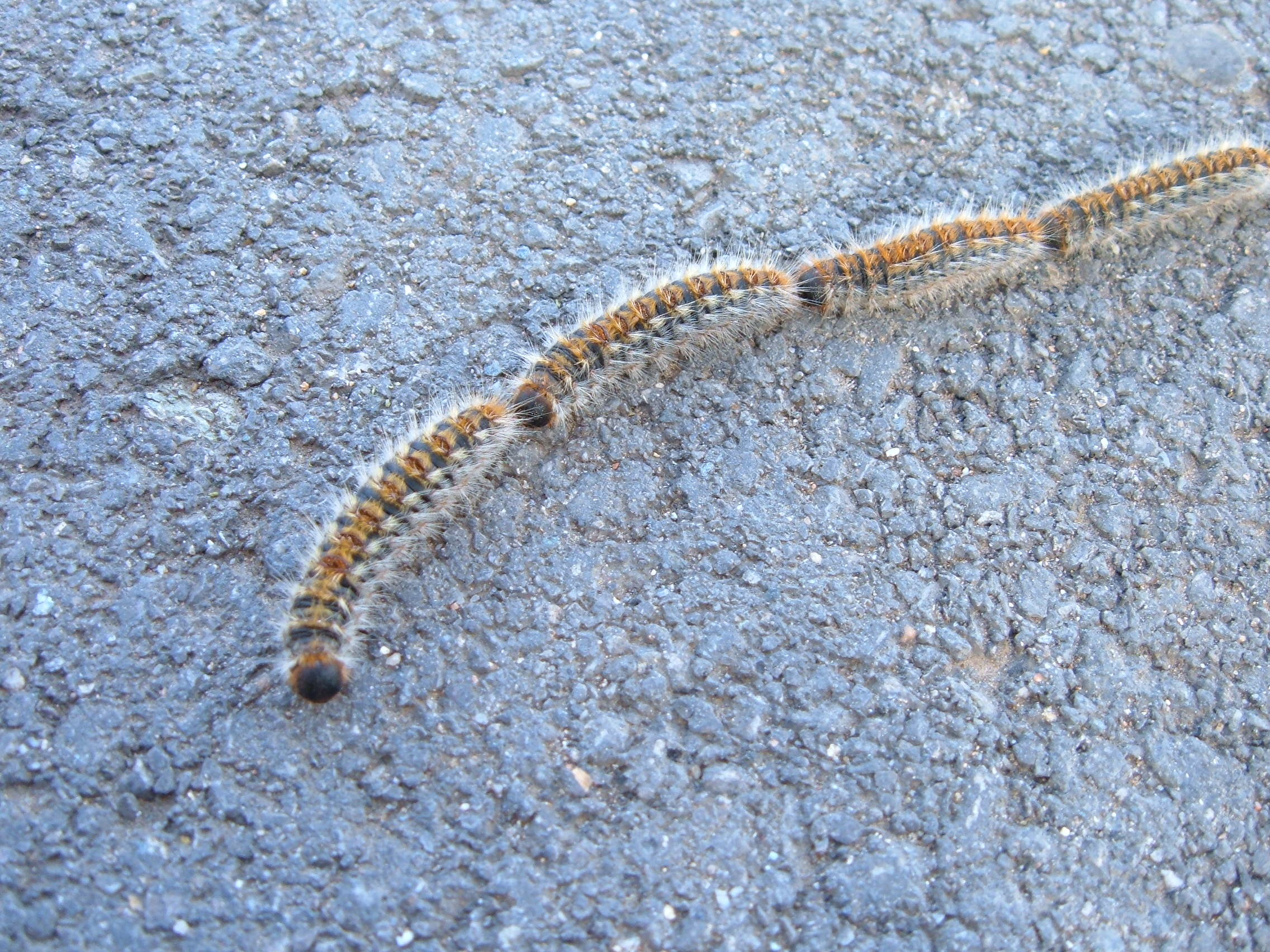
Caterpillars of the pine processionary (Thaumetopoea pityocampa)

== Genera and some species ==
- Aglaosoma
  - Aglaosoma variegata
- Axiocleta
- Cynosarga
- Epicoma
  - Epicoma contristis
  - Epicoma melanospila
  - Epicoma melanosticta
  - Epicoma tristis
- Mesodrepta
- Ochrogaster
- Tanystola
- Thaumetopoea
- Trichiocercus
  - Trichiocercus sparshalli

== See also ==
- Comparison of butterflies and moths
- Ochrogaster lunifer, an Australian processionary caterpillar
