= Black moth =

Black moth or Black Moth can refer to:

== Moths ==
- Arctornis l-nigrum, black V moth
- Ascalapha odorata, black witch moth
- Biston betularia, peppered moth
- Celiptera frustulum, black bit moth
- Epicoma melanospila, black spot moth
- Glacies coracina, black mountain moth
- Hypena scabra, black snout moth
- Idia lubricalis, glossy black idia moth
- Langessa nomophilalis, black langessa moth
- Metalectra tantillus, black fungus moth
- Panthea acronyctoides, black zigzag moth
- Parascotia fuliginaria, waved black moth
- Penestola bufalis, black penestola moth
- Siona lineata, black-veined moth
- Trichodezia albovittata, white-striped black moth
- Zale undularis, black zale moth

== Others ==
- The Black Moth, 1921 novel by Georgette Heyer
- Black Moth, stoner rock band from Leeds, England
- "Black Moth", first song in Of the Wand & the Moon 2005 album Sonnenheim

== See also ==
- Black Moth Super Rainbow, an American experimental band founded 2003
- Judas as Black Moth, a 2005 compilation album of British group Current 93
