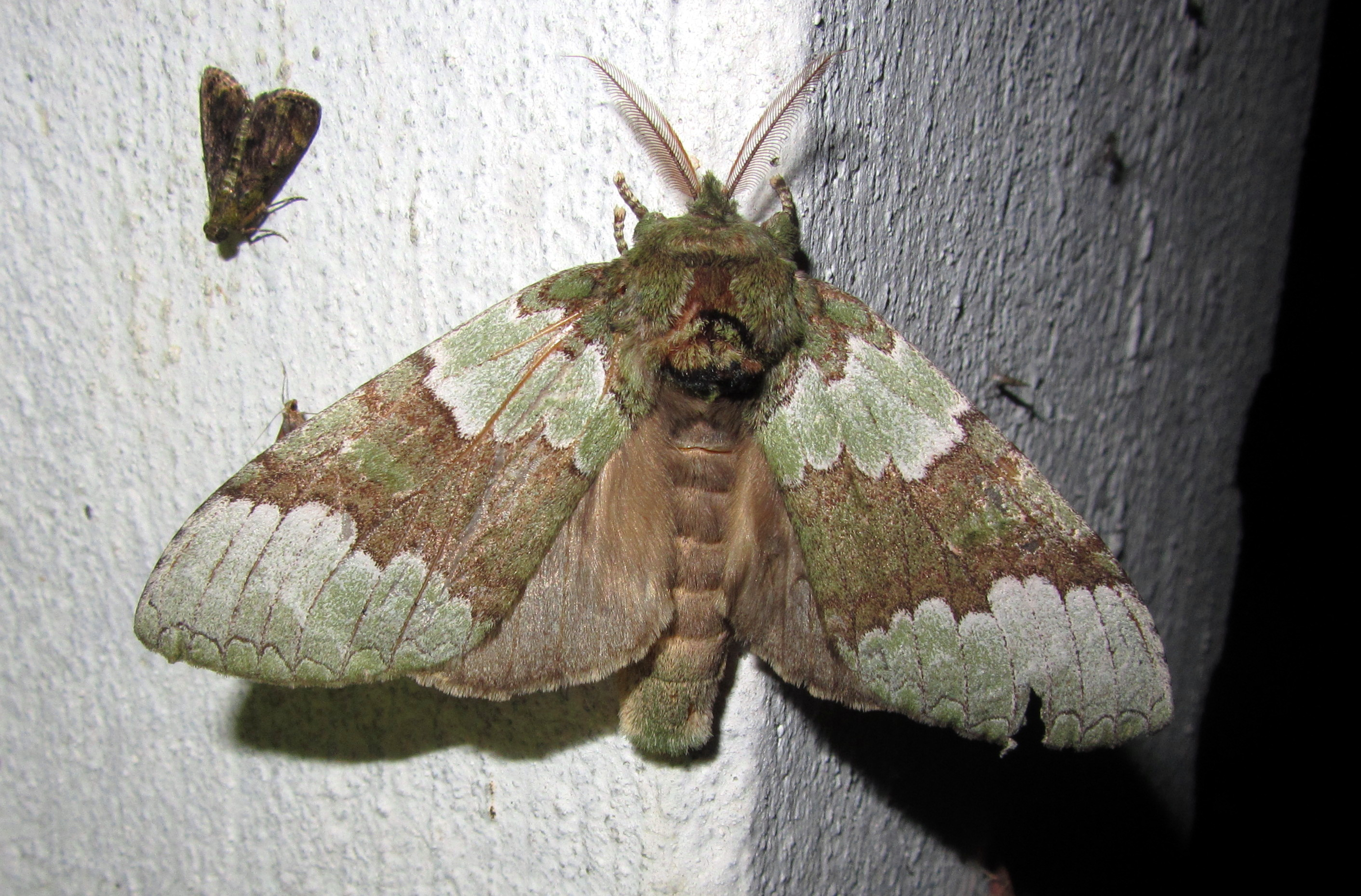
- Netria multispinae

Scientific classification
- Kingdom: Animalia
- Phylum: Arthropoda
- Class: Insecta
- Order: Lepidoptera
- Superfamily: Noctuoidea
- Family: Notodontidae
- Genus: Netria; Walker, 1855

= Netria =

Genus of moths

Netria is a genus of moths of the family Notodontidae erected by Francis Walker in 1855.

== Selected species ==
- Netria arisemna (Turner, 1931)
- Netria bipartita Schintlmeister, 2006
- Netria carentis Schintlmeister, 2006
- Netria insularis Schintlmeister, 2006
- Netria jakli Schintlmeister, 2006
- Netria longisacci Schintlmeister, 2006
- Netria livoris Schintlmeister, 2006
- Netria multispinae Schintlmeister, 2006
- Netria palawana Schintlmeister, 2006
- Netria speideli Schintlmeister, 2006
- Netria torajae Schintlmeister, 2006
- Netria viridescens Walker, 1855
