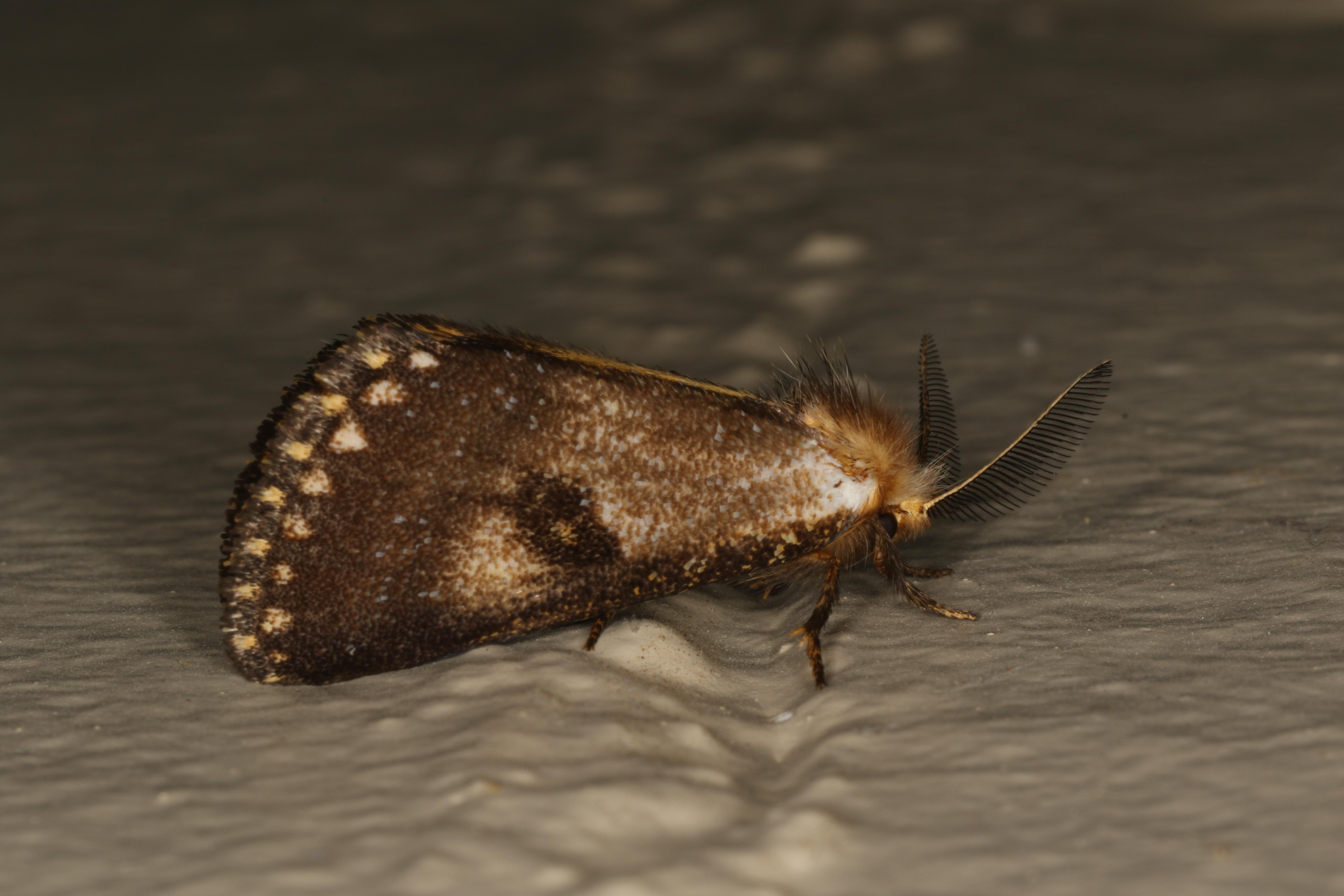
- Epicoma contristis

Scientific classification
- Kingdom: Animalia
- Phylum: Arthropoda
- Clade: Pancrustacea
- Class: Insecta
- Order: Lepidoptera
- Superfamily: Noctuoidea
- Family: Notodontidae
- Subfamily: Thaumetopoeinae
- Genus: Epicoma; Hübner, 1819

= Epicoma =

Genus of moths

Epicoma is a genus of prominent moths in the family Notodontidae. There are more than 20 described species in Epicoma, found mainly in Australia.

== Species ==
These 25 species belong to the genus Epicoma:

- Epicoma anisozyga Turner
- Epicoma argentata Walker, 1865
- Epicoma argentosa T.P.Lucas, 1890
- Epicoma asbolina Turner, 1902
- Epicoma barnardi
- Epicoma barytima Turner, 1917
- Epicoma chrysosema Turner
- Epicoma contristis
- Epicoma derbyana Strand, 1929
- Epicoma dispar Turner
- Epicoma isabella White, 1841
- Epicoma melanospila Walker
- Epicoma melanosticta Don.
- Epicoma nigrolineata Joicey & Talbot
- Epicoma ochrogutta Herrich-Schäffer
- Epicoma phoenura Turner
- Epicoma pontifascialis Rosenstock, 1885
- Epicoma pontificalis
- Epicoma protrahens T.P.Lucas, 1890
- Epicoma rubricorpus Swinhoe
- Epicoma signata Walker
- Epicoma subargentea
- Epicoma tristis Lewin
- Epicoma walkeri Strand, 1929
- Epicoma zelotes Turner
