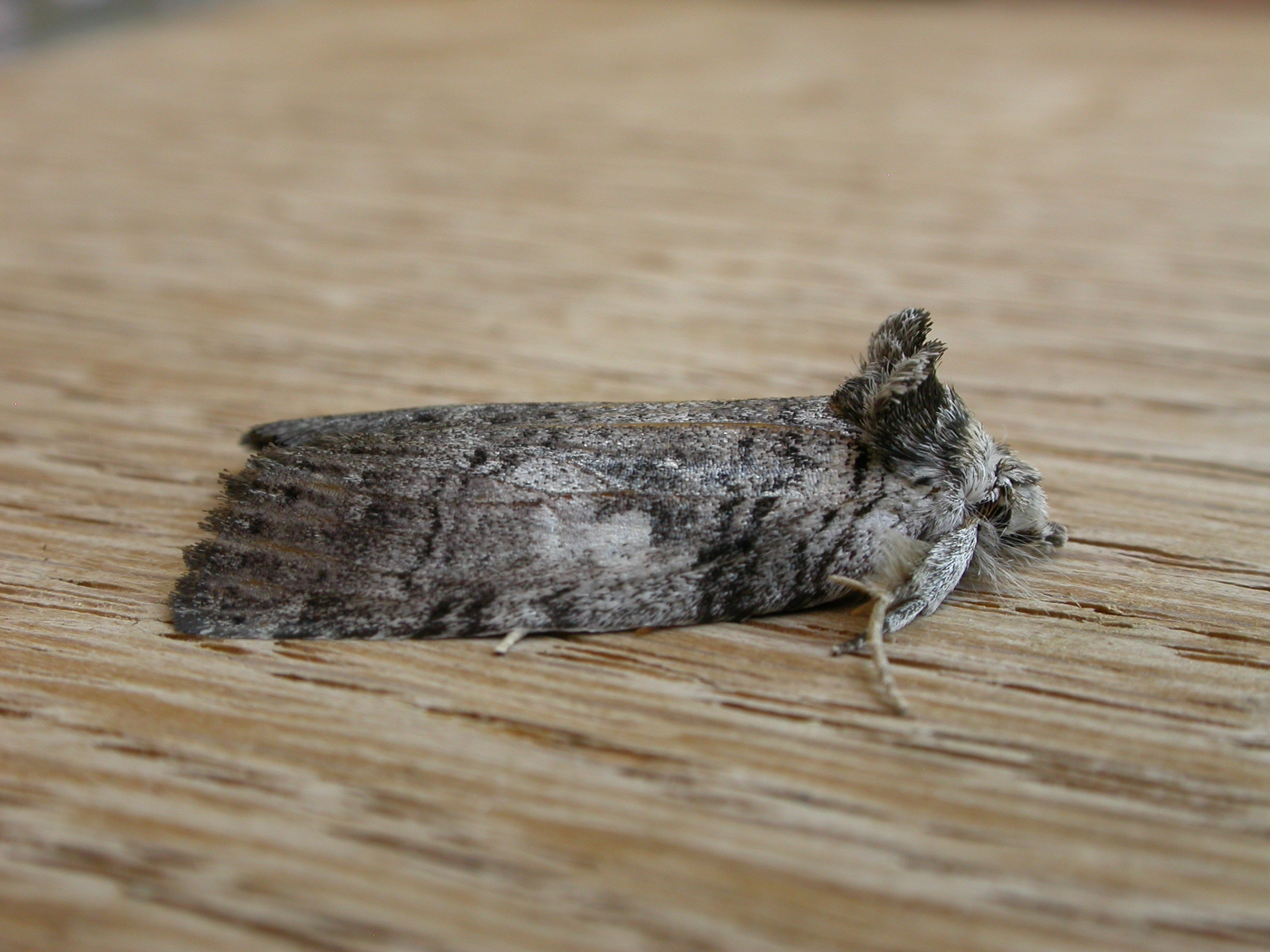
- Gallaba ochropepla

Scientific classification
- Domain: Eukaryota
- Kingdom: Animalia
- Phylum: Arthropoda
- Class: Insecta
- Order: Lepidoptera
- Superfamily: Noctuoidea
- Family: Notodontidae
- Genus: Gallaba; Walker, 1865

= Gallaba =

Genus of moths

Gallaba is a genus of moths in the family Notodontidae found in Australia.

== List of species ==
The recognized list of species include:

- Gallaba basinipha Turner, 1931
- Gallaba duplicata Walker, 1865
- Gallaba dysthyma Turner, 1931
- Gallaba eugraphes Turner, 1922
- Gallaba ochropepla Turner, 1903
- Gallaba subviridis Turner, 1941
