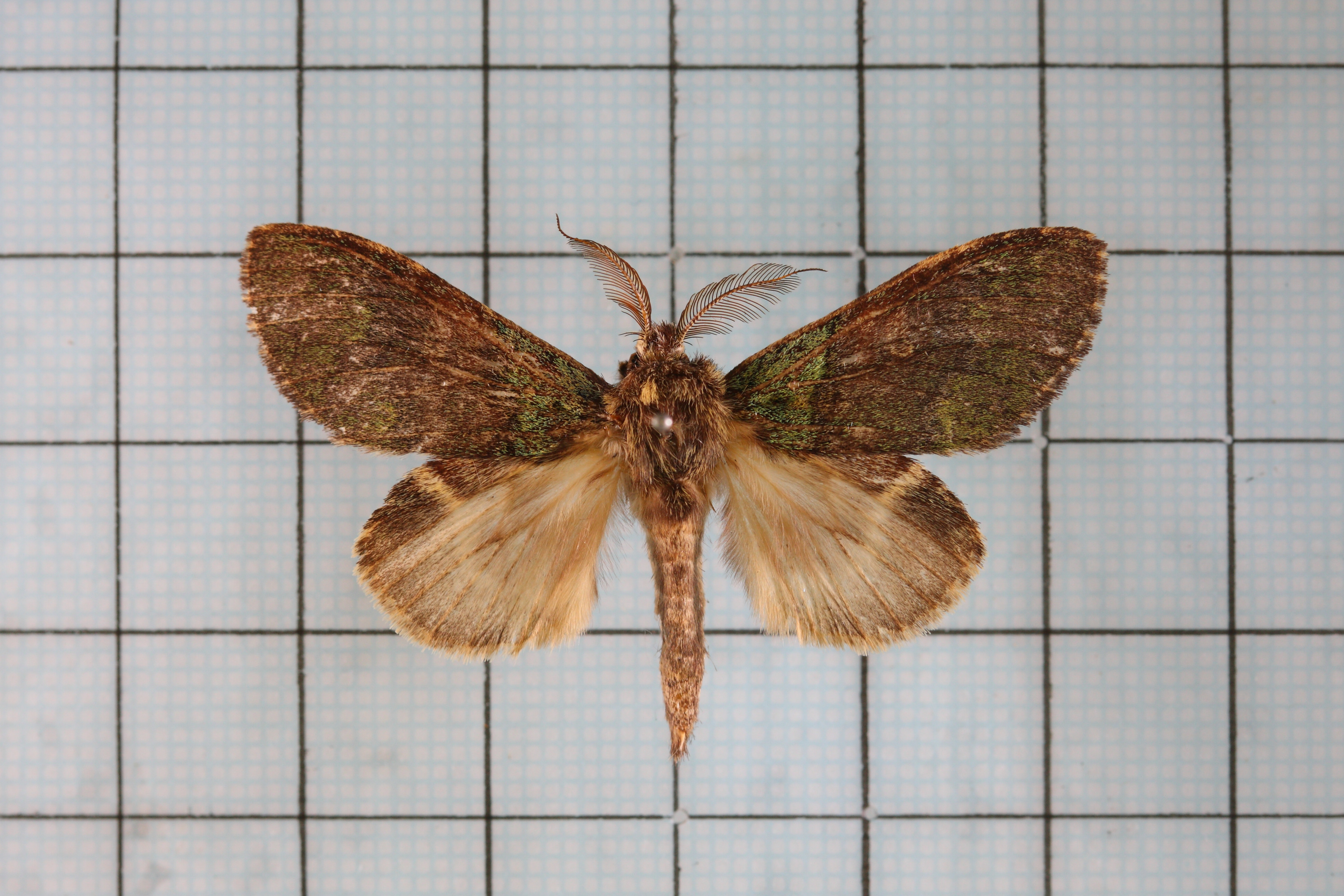

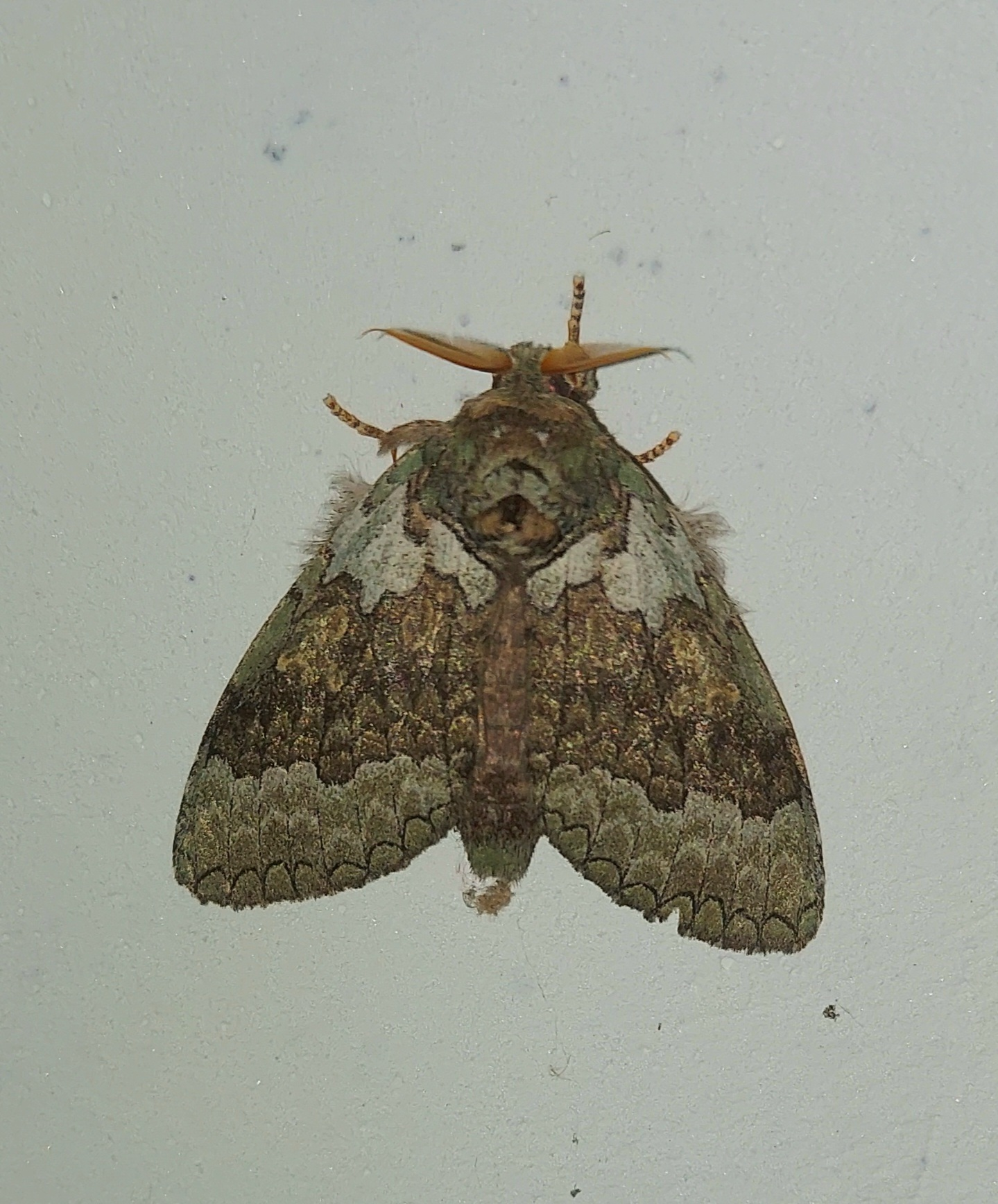
- from Sri Lanka

Scientific classification
- Kingdom: Animalia
- Phylum: Arthropoda
- Class: Insecta
- Order: Lepidoptera
- Superfamily: Noctuoidea
- Family: Notodontidae
- Genus: Netria
- Species: N. viridescens

Binomial name
- Netria viridescens Walker, 1855

Synonyms
- Netria griseata Hampson, 1892

= Netria viridescens =

Species of moth

Netria viridescens is a moth of the family Notodontidae. It is found from the Oriental Tropics to New Guinea.

The wingspan is 66–87 mm.

The larvae only feed on young leaves of Bassia, Mimusops, Sideroxylon and Achras sapota.

== Subspecies ==
- Netria viridescens viridescens (Java, Bali, Sundaland to New Guinea)
- Netria viridescens continentalis Schintlmeister, 2006 (north-western and north-eastern India, Nepal, Myanmar, southern China, Sri Lanka, Taiwan, Vietnam, Laos, Cambodia, Thailand)
- Netria viridescens pallidabasis Schintlmeister, 2006 (Palawan)
- Netria viridescens suffusca Schintlmeister, 2006 (China: Yunnan)
