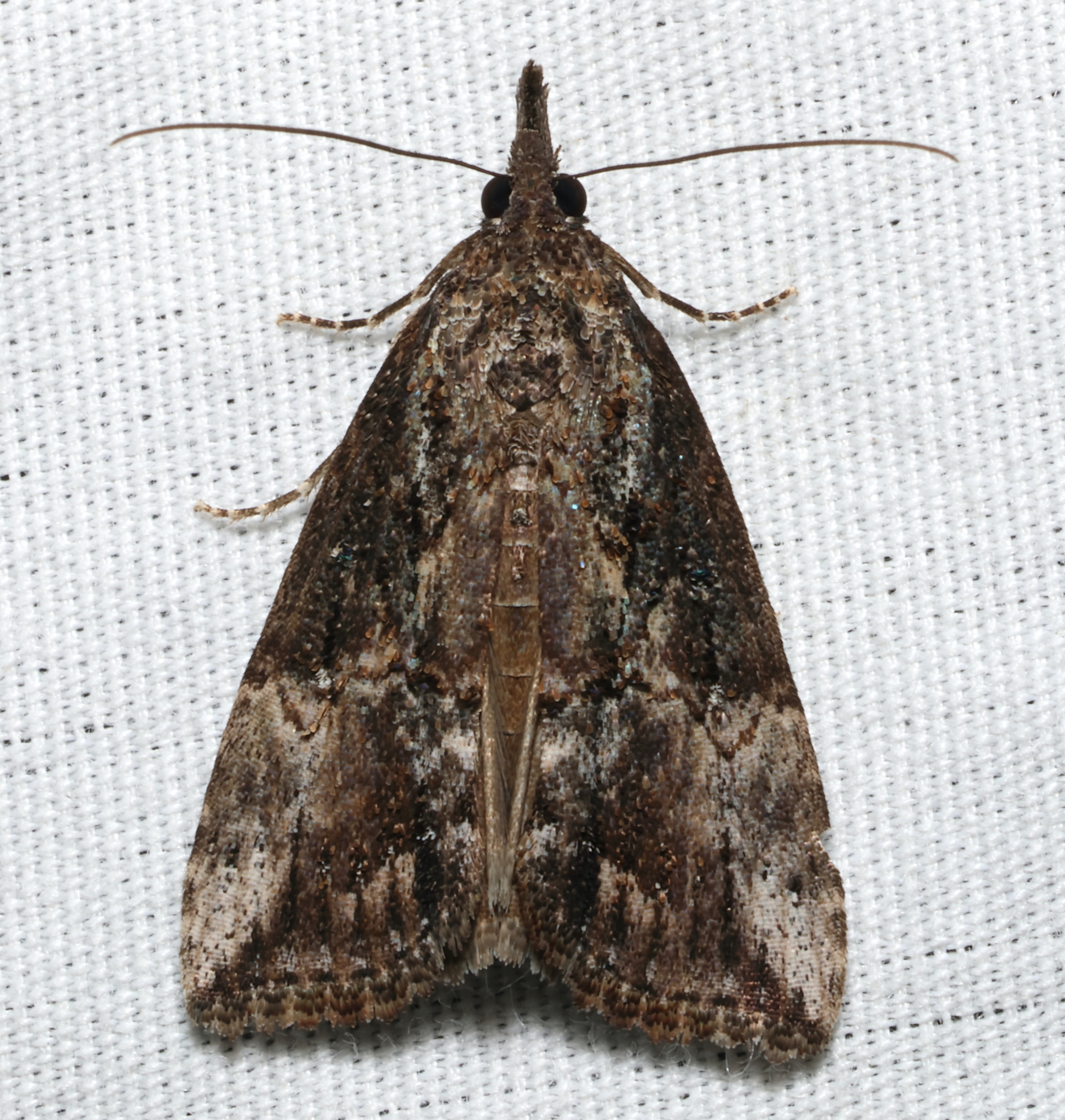

Scientific classification
- Kingdom: Animalia
- Phylum: Arthropoda
- Clade: Pancrustacea
- Class: Insecta
- Order: Lepidoptera
- Superfamily: Noctuoidea
- Family: Erebidae
- Genus: Hypena
- Species: H. scabra

Binomial name
- Hypena scabra (Fabricius, 1798)

Synonyms
- Plathypena scabra (Fabricius, 1798); Hypena erectalis Guenée, 1854; Hypena revoluta Walker, 1858; Hypena revoluta Walker, 1858 (preocc. Walker, 1858); Hypena subrufalis Grote, 1872

= Hypena scabra =

Species of moth

Hypena scabra, the green cloverworm or black snout, is a moth of the family Erebidae. The species was first described by Johan Christian Fabricius in 1798. It is found in North America from Canada south to Florida and Texas. It has also been reported from Great Britain, due to an American soybean shipment.

The wingspan is 25–35 mm. Adults are on wing from March to November or all year round in warmer regions. There are multiple generations per year.

It is a generalist, and larvae feed on a wide variety of plants including many within the pea family (Fabaceae). It also reportedly feeds on maples (Acer), cherries (Prunus), hackberries (Celtis), elms (Ulmus) and many more.

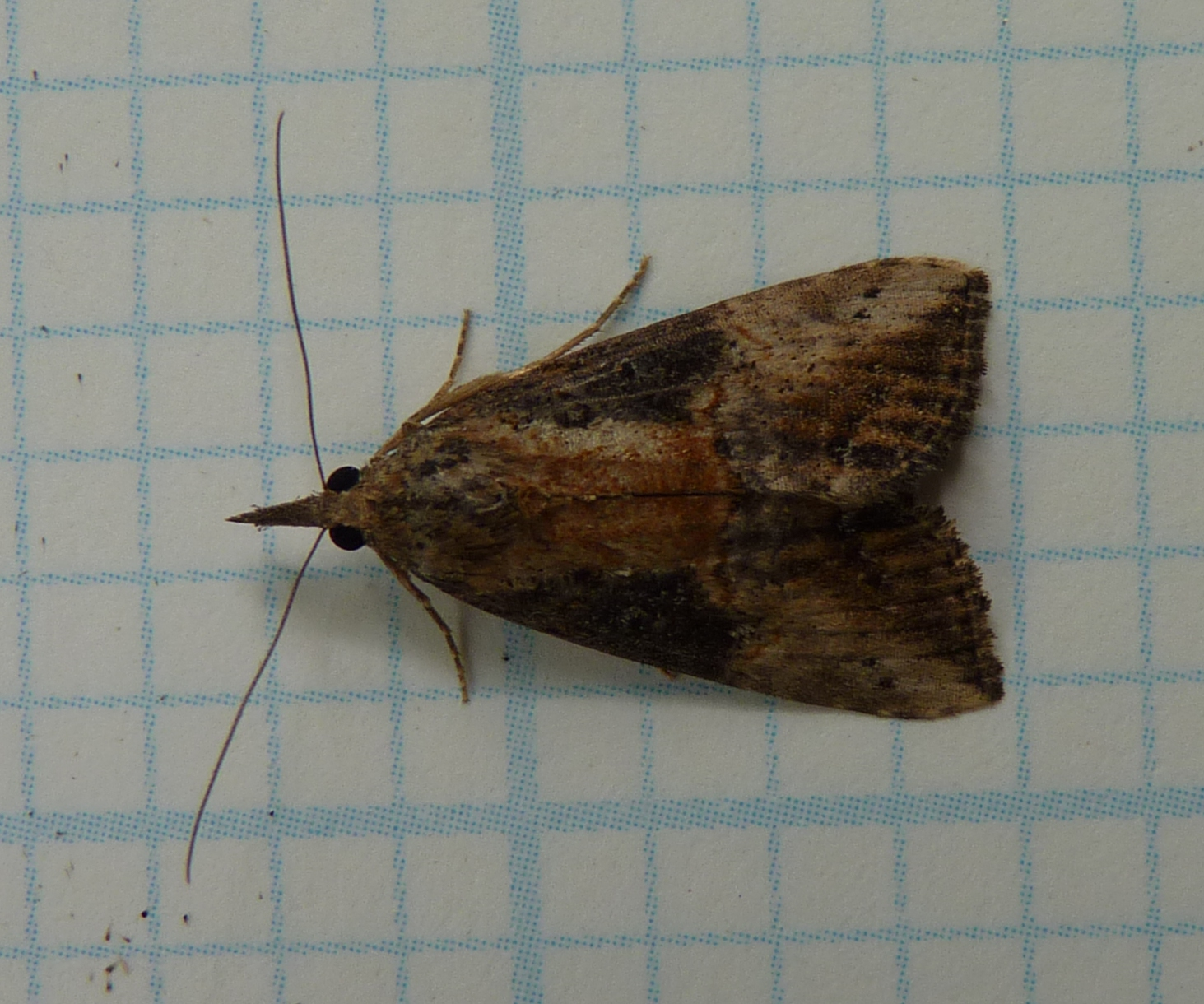

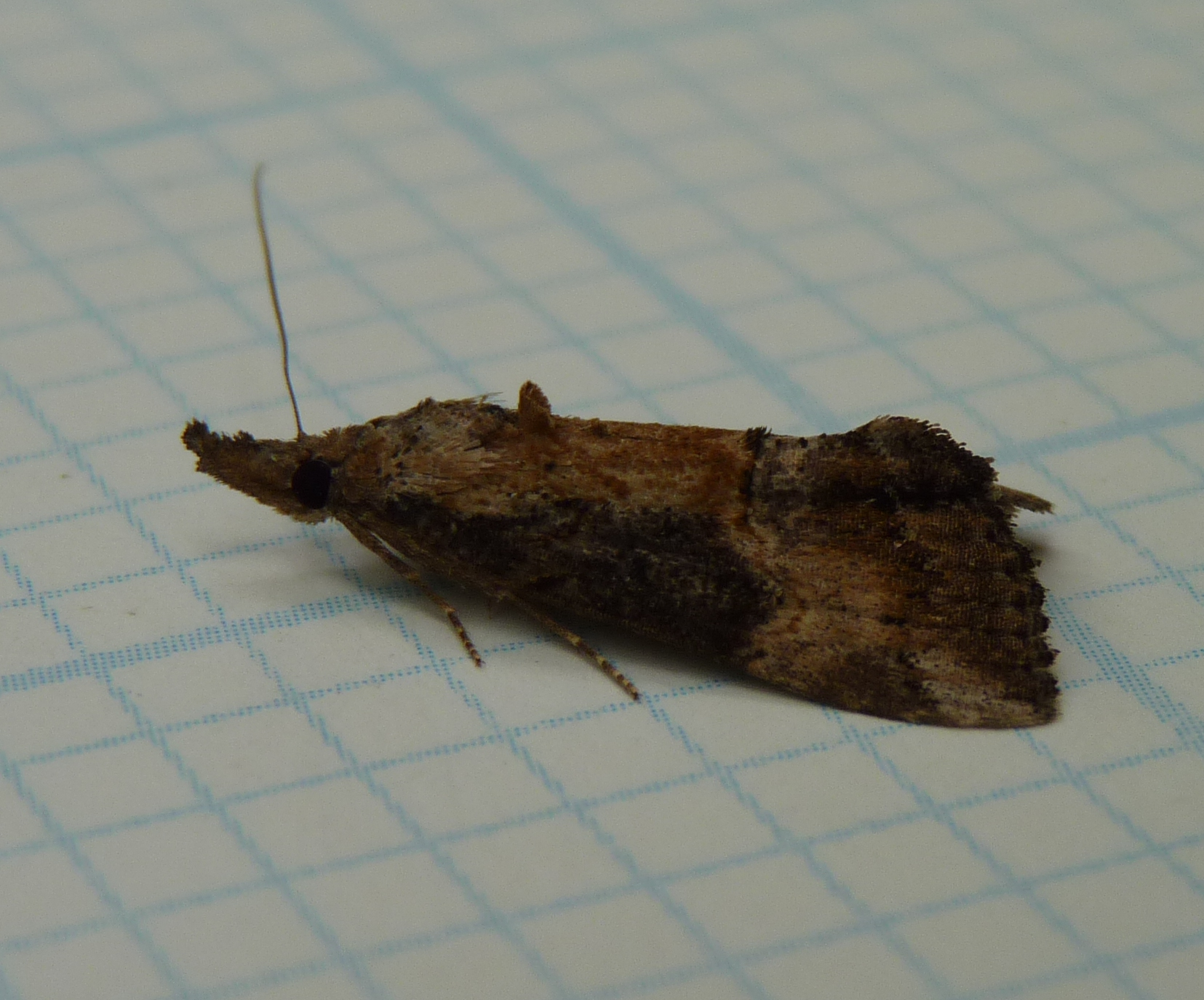
