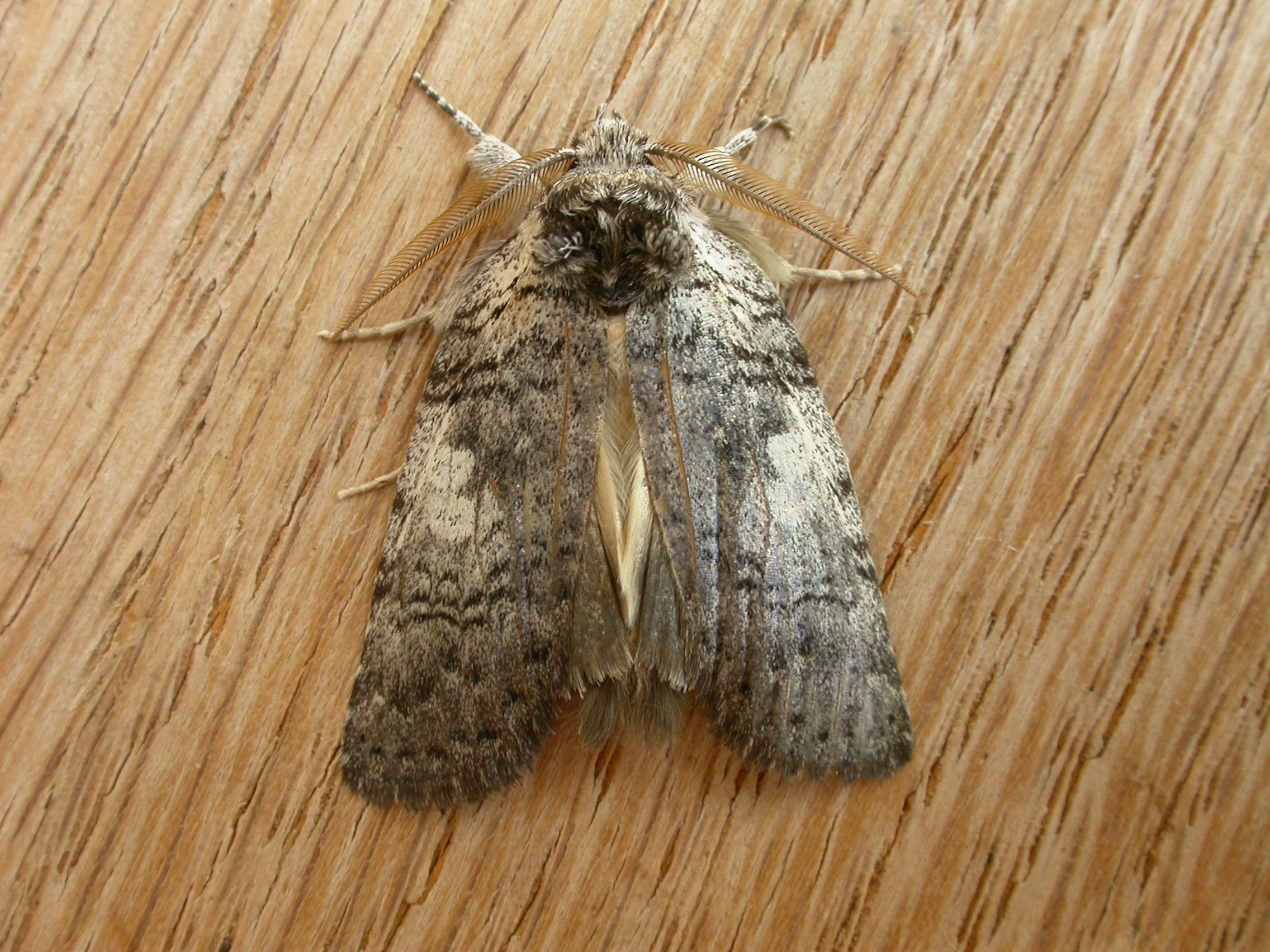

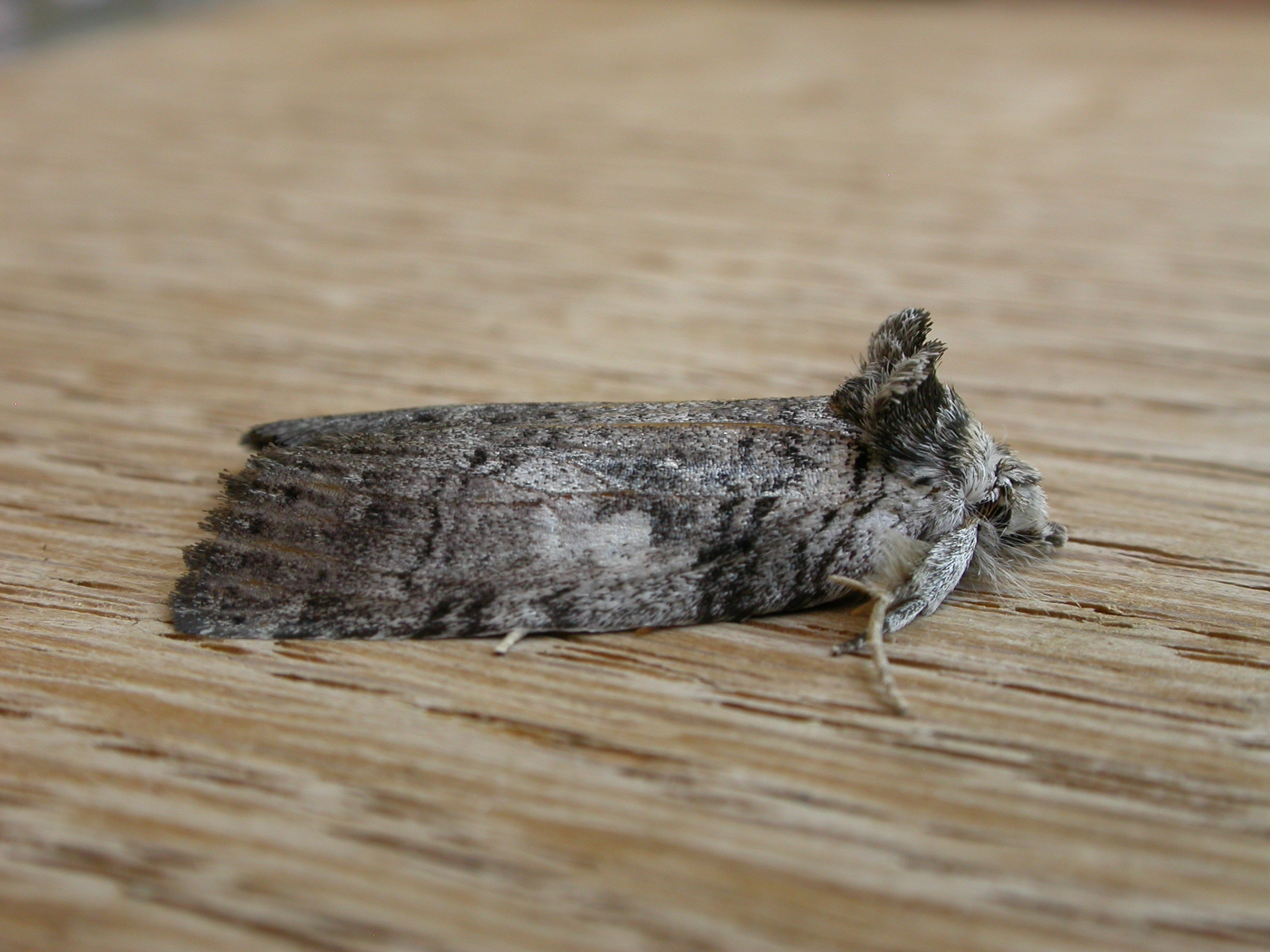

Scientific classification
- Kingdom: Animalia
- Phylum: Arthropoda
- Class: Insecta
- Order: Lepidoptera
- Superfamily: Noctuoidea
- Family: Notodontidae
- Genus: Gallaba
- Species: G. ochropepla

Binomial name
- Gallaba ochropepla Turner, 1903

Synonyms
- Gallaba diplocycla Turner, 1931

= Gallaba ochropepla =

Species of moth

Gallaba ochropepla is a moth of the family Notodontidae. It is known from Australia, including Tasmania, New South Wales and Victoria.

The wingspan is about 40 mm.
