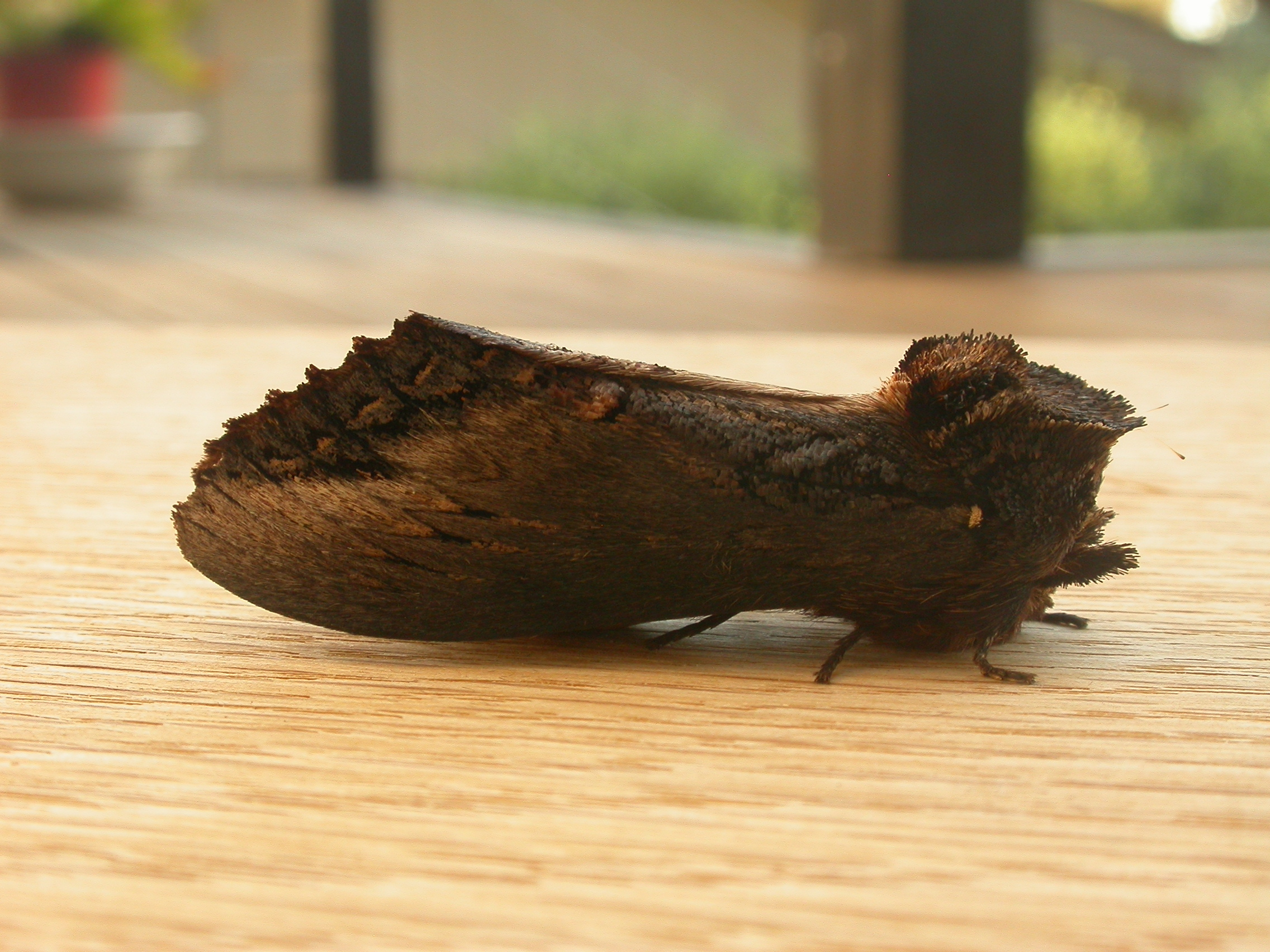

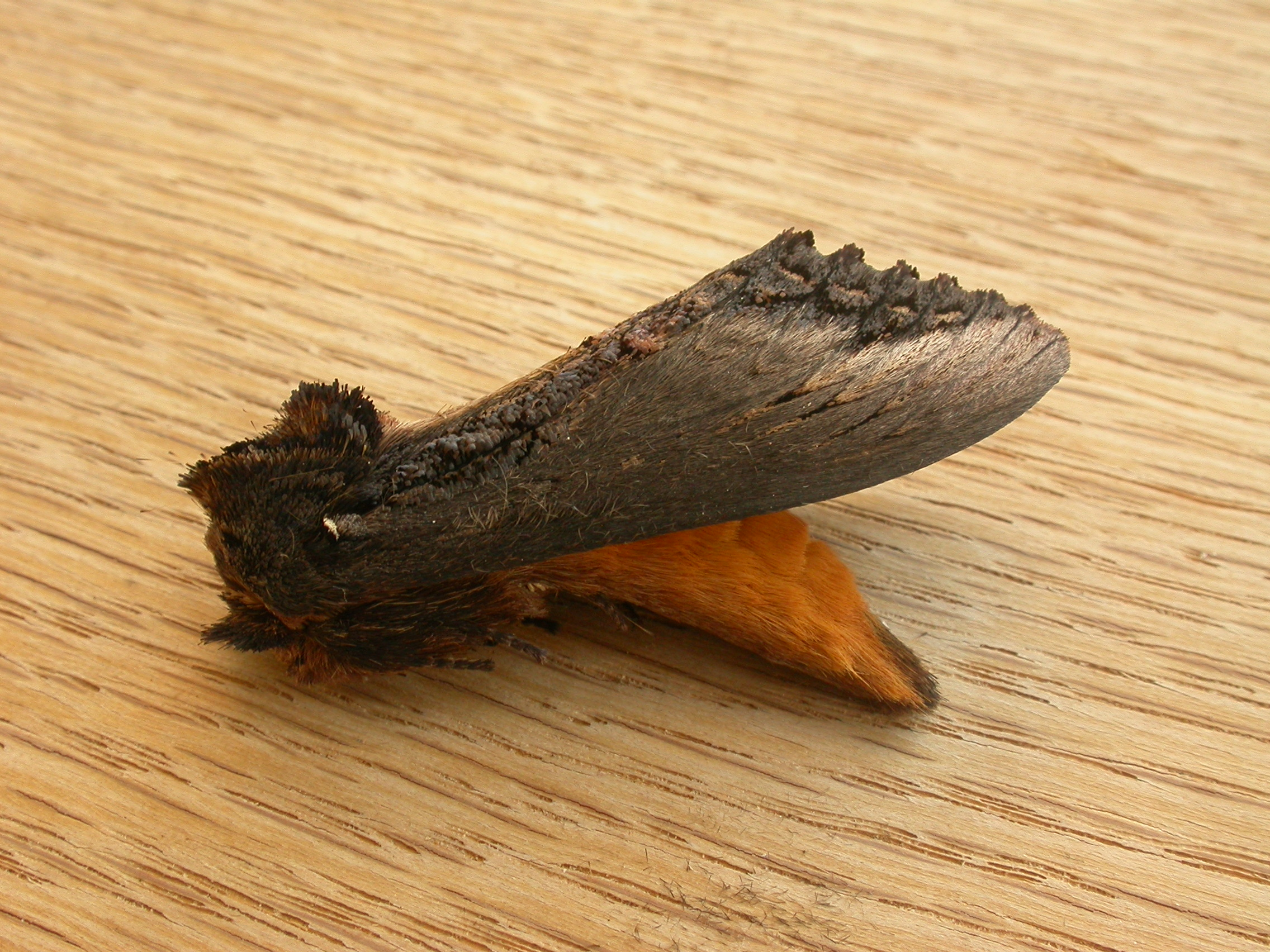

Scientific classification
- Kingdom: Animalia
- Phylum: Arthropoda
- Clade: Pancrustacea
- Class: Insecta
- Order: Lepidoptera
- Superfamily: Noctuoidea
- Family: Notodontidae
- Genus: Hylaeora
- Species: H. caustopis

Binomial name
- Hylaeora caustopis Tepper, 1890

Synonyms
- Hyleora lacerta H. Druce, 1901

= Hylaeora caustopis =

Species of moth

Hylaeora caustopis is a moth of the family Notodontidae. It is known from the southern half of mainland Australia.
