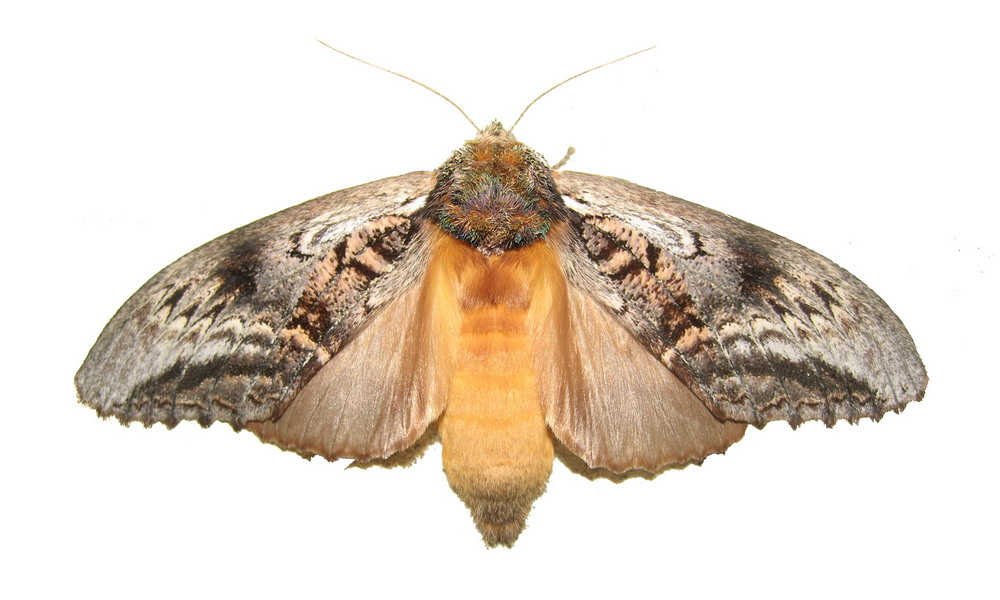

Scientific classification
- Kingdom: Animalia
- Phylum: Arthropoda
- Clade: Pancrustacea
- Class: Insecta
- Order: Lepidoptera
- Superfamily: Noctuoidea
- Family: Notodontidae
- Genus: Hylaeora
- Species: H. eucalypti

Binomial name
- Hylaeora eucalypti Doubleday, 1849

Synonyms
- Sorama inclyta Walker, 1862; Hyleora sphinx R. Felder, 1874; Hylaeora sphinx R. Felder, 1874

= Hylaeora eucalypti =

Species of insect

Hylaeora eucalypti is a moth of the family Notodontidae. It is found in the southern half of Australia, including the Australian states of South Australia, Victoria, New South Wales and Tasmania.

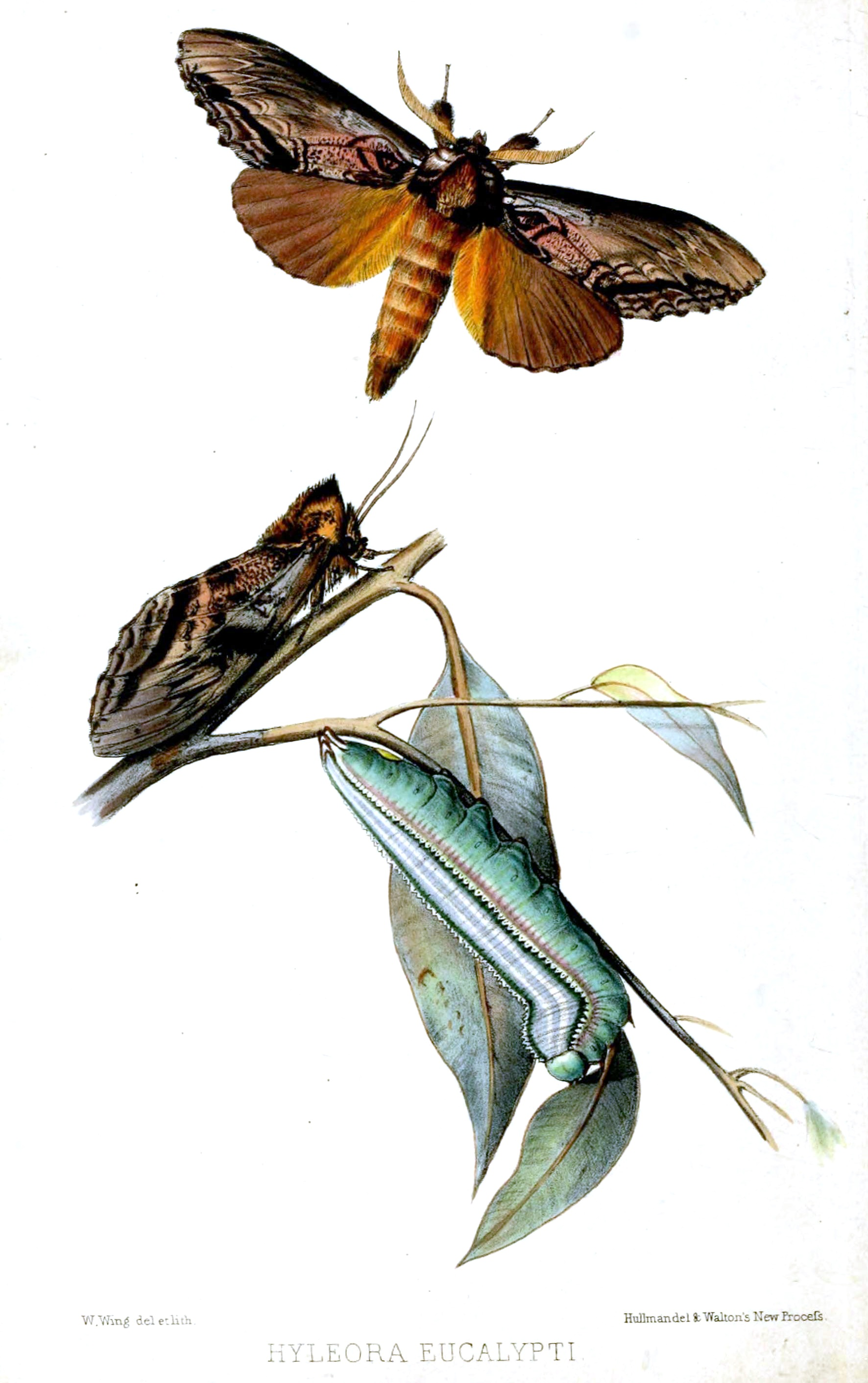
Illustration accompanying original description (1849)

The larvae feed on Eucalyptus species.
