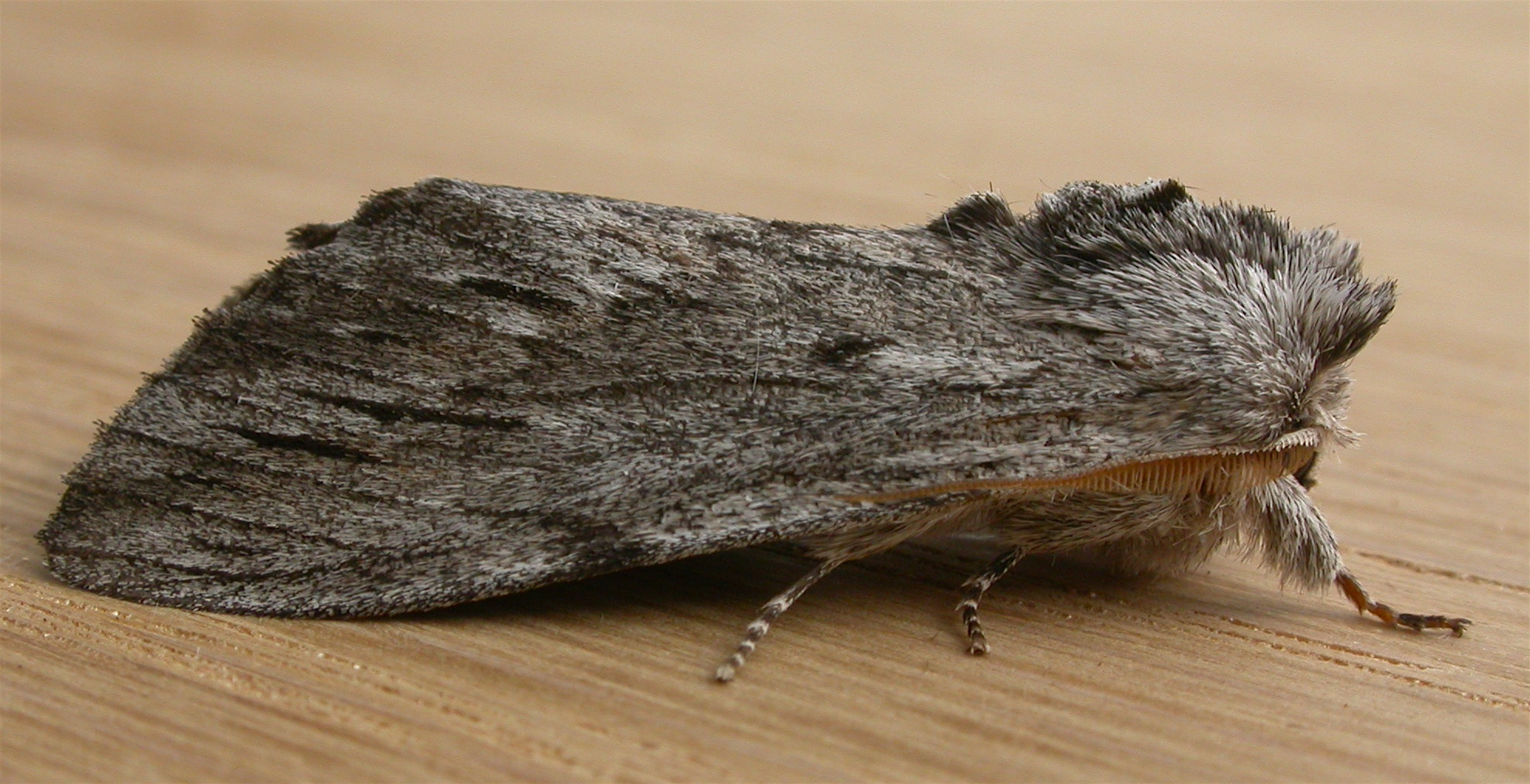

Scientific classification
- Kingdom: Animalia
- Phylum: Arthropoda
- Clade: Pancrustacea
- Class: Insecta
- Order: Lepidoptera
- Superfamily: Noctuoidea
- Family: Notodontidae
- Subfamily: Notodontinae
- Genus: Destolmia; Walker, 1855
- Species: D. lineata

Binomial name
- Destolmia lineata Walker, 1855

= Destolmia =

SGenus of moths

Destolmia lineata is a moth of the family Notodontidae. It is the only species in the genus Destolmia. It is found in Australia.

The larvae feed on Eucalyptus caesia.
