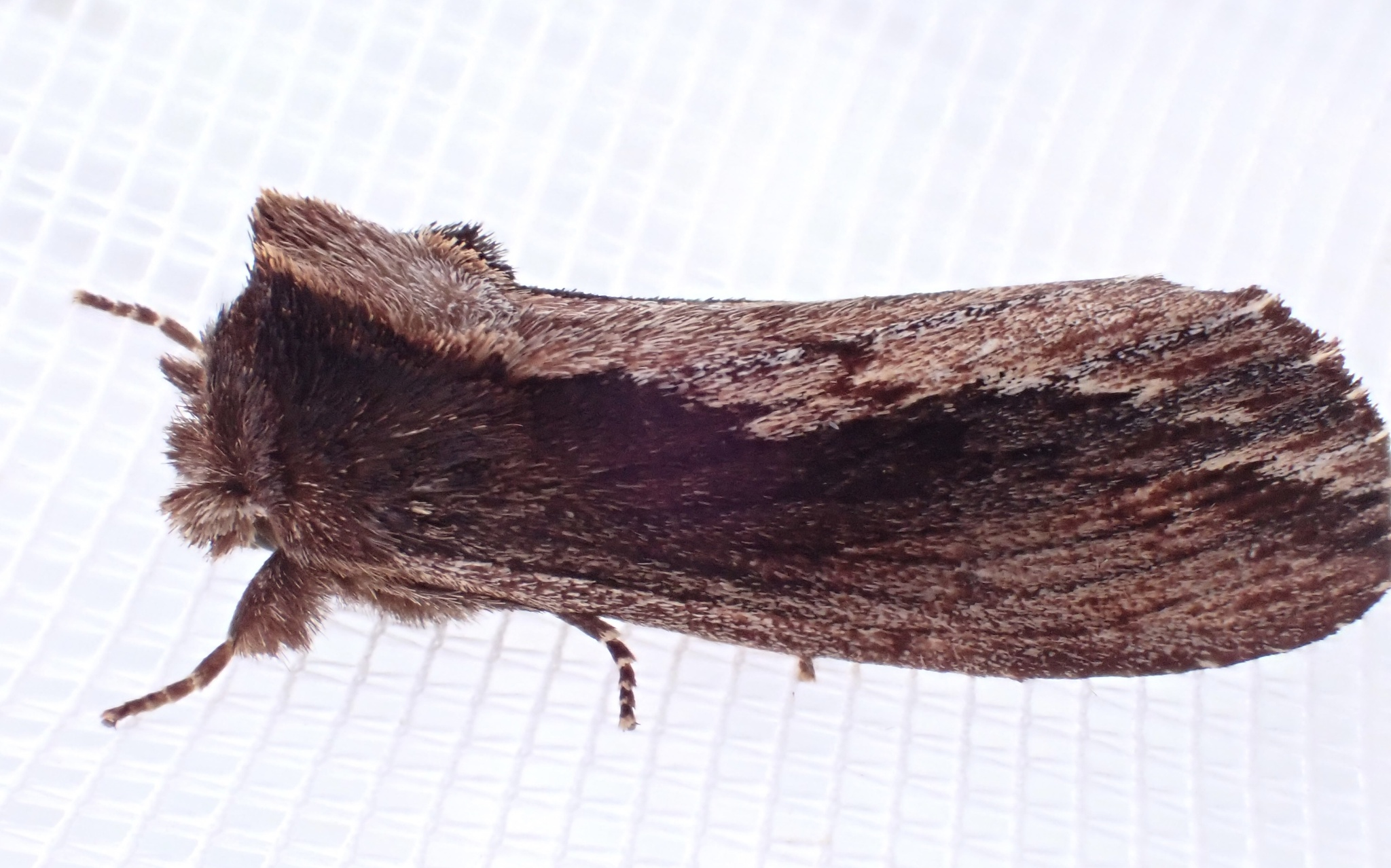
- Hylaeora capucina, Australia

Scientific classification
- Kingdom: Animalia
- Phylum: Arthropoda
- Clade: Pancrustacea
- Class: Insecta
- Order: Lepidoptera
- Superfamily: Noctuoidea
- Family: Notodontidae
- Genus: Hylaeora
- Species: H. capucina

Binomial name
- Hylaeora capucina Felder, 1874

= Hylaeora capucina =

Species of moth

Hylaeora capucina is a species of prominent moth in the family Notodontidae, found in Australia, where it is recorded from New South Wales, Victoria and the Australian Capital Territory. Larvae feed on Eucalyptus.
