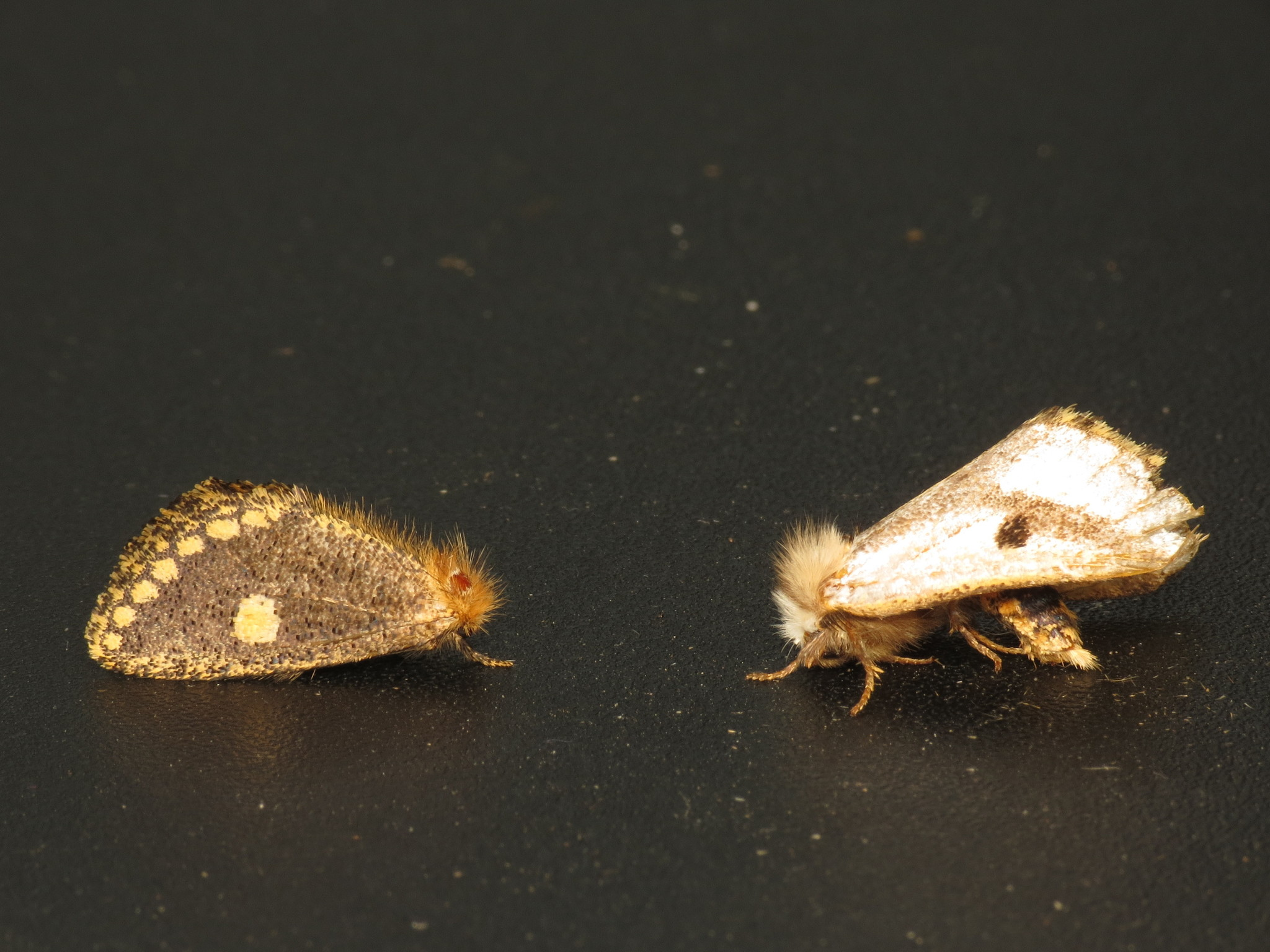

Scientific classification
- Domain: Eukaryota
- Kingdom: Animalia
- Phylum: Arthropoda
- Class: Insecta
- Order: Lepidoptera
- Superfamily: Noctuoidea
- Family: Notodontidae
- Genus: Epicoma
- Species: E. protrahens

Binomial name
- Epicoma protrahens T. P. Lucas, 1890

= Epicoma protrahens =

Species of moth

Epicoma protrahens is a processional moth of the family Notodontidae first described by Thomas Pennington Lucas in 1890. It is found on the east coast of Australia.
