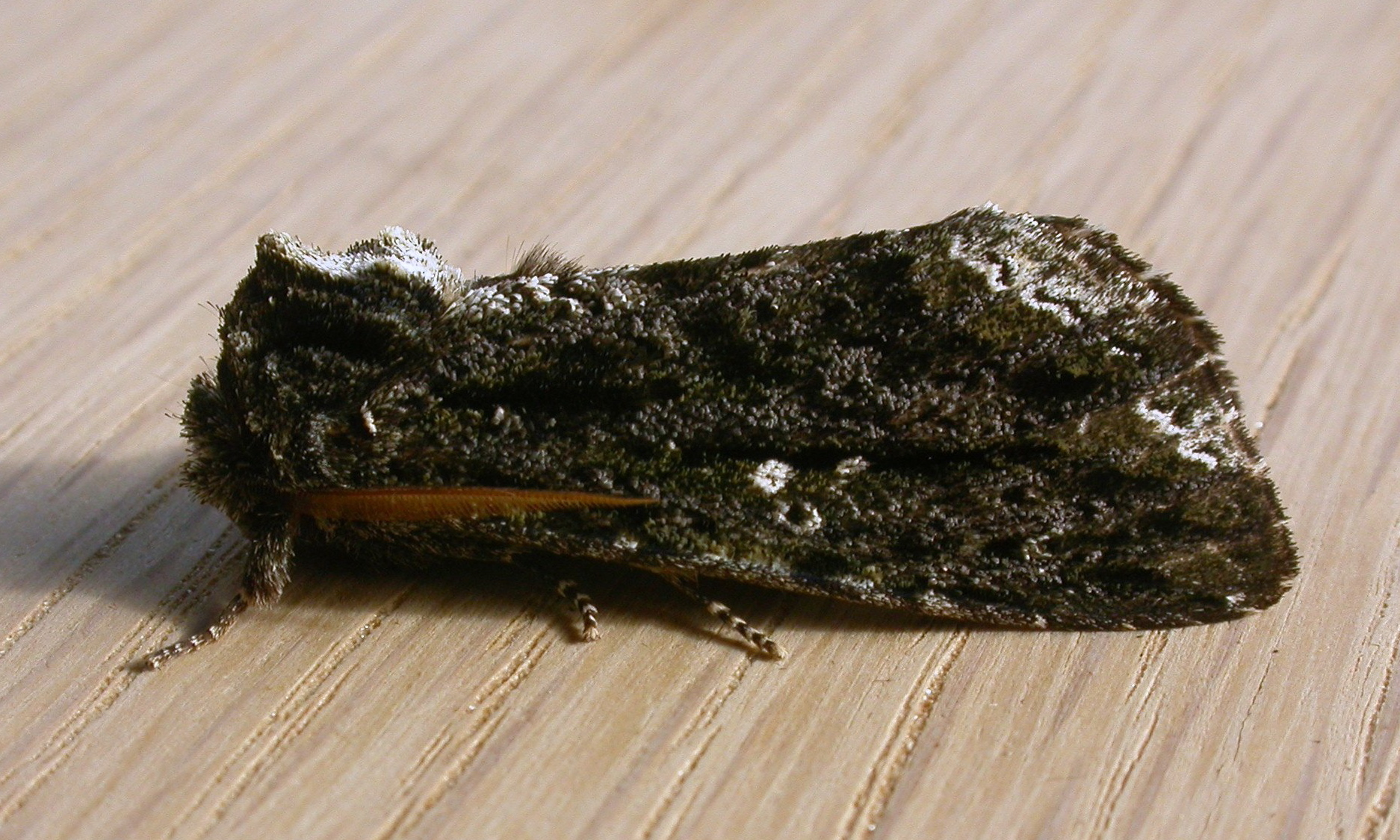

Scientific classification
- Kingdom: Animalia
- Phylum: Arthropoda
- Clade: Pancrustacea
- Class: Insecta
- Order: Lepidoptera
- Superfamily: Noctuoidea
- Family: Notodontidae
- Genus: Neola
- Species: N. semiaurata

Binomial name
- Neola semiaurata Walker, 1855

= Neola semiaurata =

Species of moth

Neola semiaurata is a moth of the family Notodontidae. Described by Francis Walker in 1855, it is found in Australia.

The wingspan is about 60 mm.

The larvae feed on Acacia species, including Acacia prominens.
