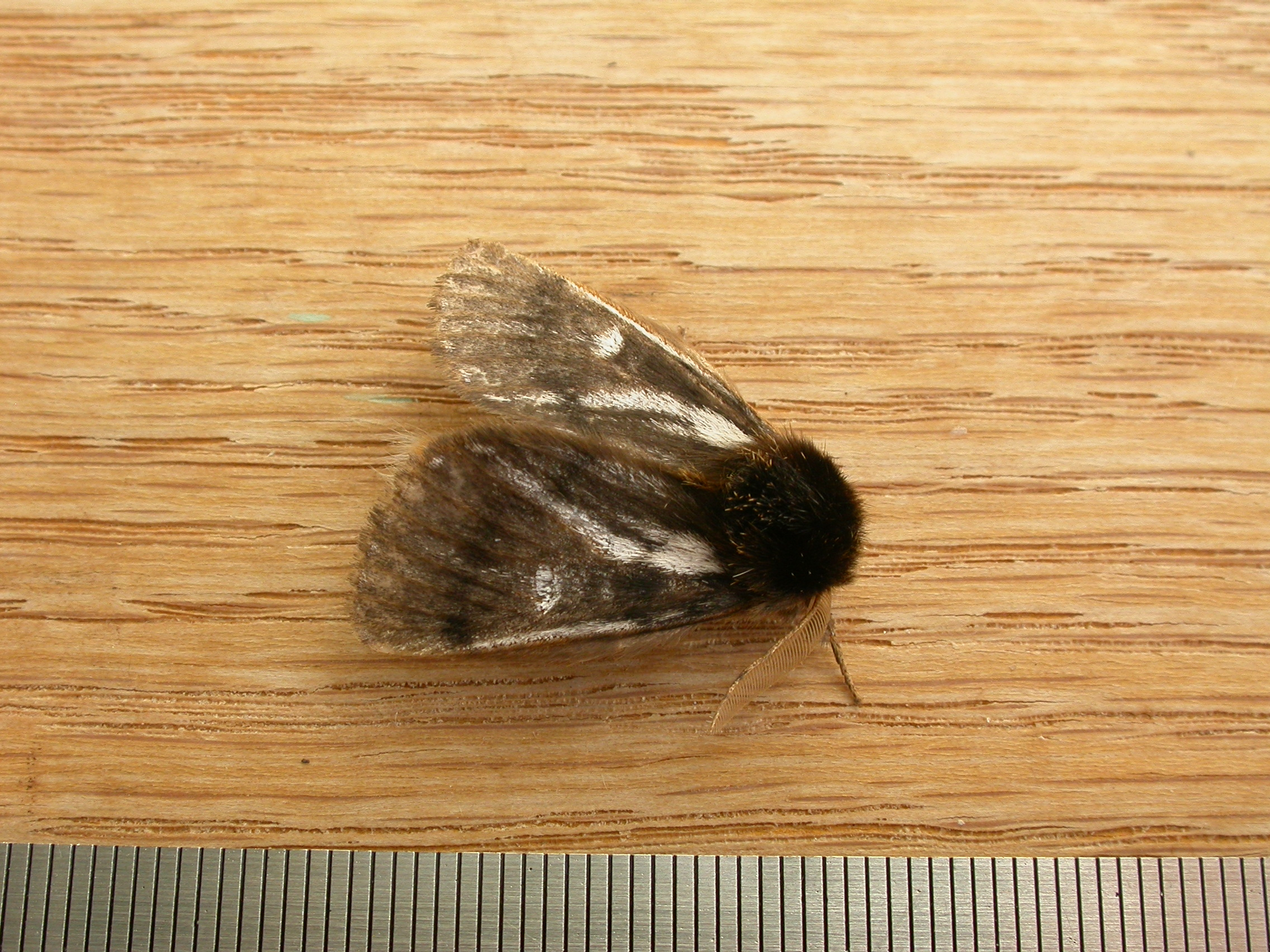

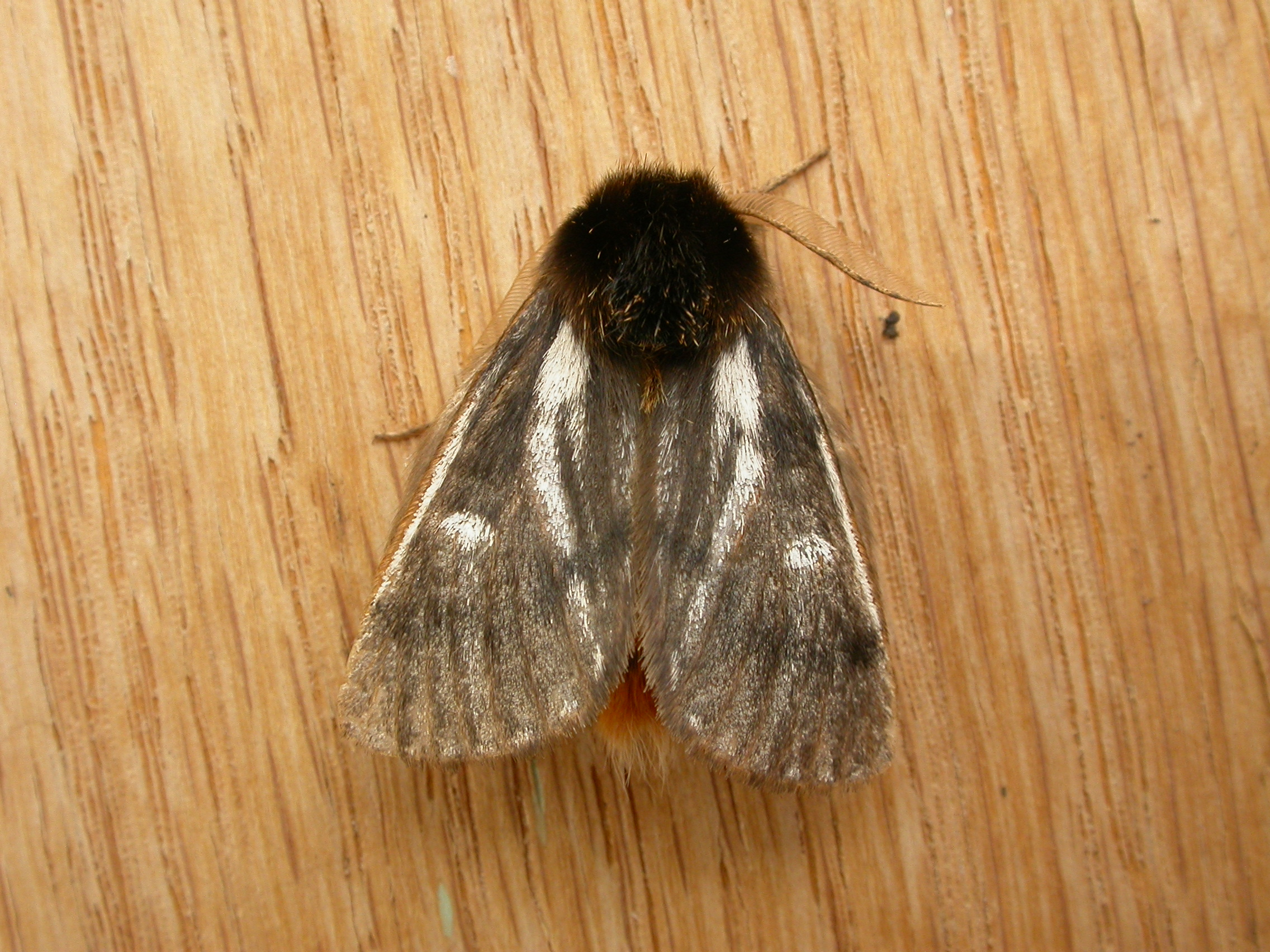

Scientific classification
- Kingdom: Animalia
- Phylum: Arthropoda
- Clade: Pancrustacea
- Class: Insecta
- Order: Lepidoptera
- Superfamily: Noctuoidea
- Family: Notodontidae
- Genus: Ochrogaster
- Species: O. lunifer

Binomial name
- Ochrogaster lunifer Herrich-Schäffer, 1855

= Ochrogaster =

Bag-shelter moth

Species of moth

Ochrogaster lunifer, the bag-shelter moth or processionary caterpillar, is a member of the family Notodontidae. The species was first described by Gottlieb August Wilhelm Herrich-Schäffer in 1855. Both the larval and adult forms have hairs that cause irritation of the skin (urticaria). The adult moth has a woolly appearance and its wings can grow to be about 5.5 cm across. The larvae feed on Grevillea striata at night and reside in brown silken bag nests during the day.

== Biology ==
Ochrogaster lunifer has a one-year lifecycle, living communally with siblings and conspecifics from egg to pre-pupa. In October to November (Spring), adult moths emerge from the pupae underground, mate and the females lay an egg mass containing 150–550 eggs on the trunk or in the canopy of a host tree. Host trees include species of wattles and eucalypts. The eggs hatch after approximately 3–4 weeks. The caterpillars moult 7 times giving 8 instars which develop from December to May (Summer-Autumn). First instars do not feed and stay within the protection of the egg mass, other early instars feed on leaves in their host tree during the day and later instars feed at night. Throughout their development, the caterpillars construct a nest made of silk which fills with old caterpillar skins and frass. The nest grows larger as the caterpillars become larger. From the 3rd – 8th instar, caterpillars bear urticating setae (microscopic barbed hairs) on their abdominal segments producing more at each moult. The final 8th instar caterpillar carries more than two million setae which cause skin irritations and rashes in humans and other mammals. In April to May (Autumn), the 8th instar caterpillars leave the nest permanently in search for a pupation site where they over-winter underground as a pre-pupa. When the caterpillars leave the nest to feed or over-winter, they form a characteristic single-file procession hence the common name of ‘processionary caterpillars’. The caterpillar over-winters underground from May to October, then spins a cocoon and forms a puparium between September and November (Spring). After 2 – 4 weeks, the adult moth emerges from the pupa and uses its forelegs to tunnel from under the ground. The adults have non-functional mouthparts and do not feed throughout their short-lived adult life.

== Ecology ==
During the day the caterpillars shelter communally in a bag nest made of silk, excrement, shed skins, and other debris. Sometimes the nest is located on a shoot at the end of a branch, or sometimes high on the trunk. It can also be on the ground at the base of the food plant. The different nesting habits suggest that there may be two or more species currently being included under the Ochrogaster name.

The caterpillars feed mostly on acacia (wattle) trees and Grevillea striata (beefwood). If they have totally defoliated their food tree, the caterpillars migrate to seek out another one, leaving a silk trail. When a caterpillar of the species encounters such a trail it will follow it, especially if there is a pheromone scent associated with it. There can be a hundred or more caterpillars in a head-to-tail procession, kept together by contacting the tail hairs of the caterpillar in front. If disturbed, they curl up defensively into a tight bunch.

If two caterpillars each locate a silk trail left by the other, the pair will follow each other, walking in a circle. If a whole group does this, then they can end up in a circular mass.

When mature, the caterpillars seek out a place somewhere distant from their food plant to pupate, again leaving a silk trail as they walk. The pupa is hidden in a silk cocoon in the ground.

The caterpillars emerge from the pupa as a moth with a wingspan of up to 5.5 cm. The forewings are dark grey or brown, and the hindwings are white shading to grey at the base. Some moths have a pale dot in the centre of each forewing and some have white lines across the wings. They have a banded abdomen which ends in a white tuft of hairs. The variety of their markings also suggests that there might be more than one species present in Australia.

== Range ==
The species is found throughout mainland Australia.

== Medical and Veterinary significance ==
The egg masses, larvae (caterpillars), and adults of O. lunifer all have urticating scales or hairs that are harmful to humans and other animals. Records of Bag-shelter nests and caterpillars causing adverse effects on the health of humans and livestock date back to the early 1900s (as Teara contraria).

Ochrogaster lunifer caterpillars are covered in harmful tiny hairs called true setae, and these cause an irritating dermatitis upon contact with human skin. In addition, osteomyelitis, ophthalmia and more severe allergic reactions have been recorded (as Ochrogaster contraria Walker). In horses, ingesting O. lunifer caterpillars may cause abortions, a condition in pregnant mares called equine amnionitis and foetal loss (EAFL).

True setae are easily dislodged from the caterpillar by mechanical disturbance and then disperse further into the environment. Once dislodged from the caterpillar, setae may be carried some distance in the wind. Major sources of urticating setae are the nests where caterpillars, cast skins and frass accumulate over months, and dispersing caterpillars when they procession in autumn. Caterpillars also shed some setae as they feed and go about their daily activities.

Female adult moths have a large tuft of urticating scales at the end of their abdomen. Contact with these scales causes an itchy rash. When the female is laying her batch of eggs on the host tree, she covers the eggs with the scales from her abdominal tuft to help protect the eggs from predators.

== Gallery ==
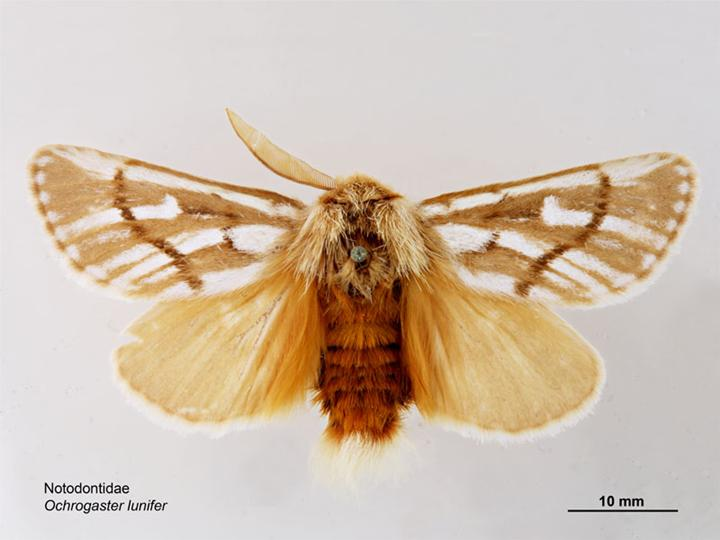
Mounted adult, dorsal view

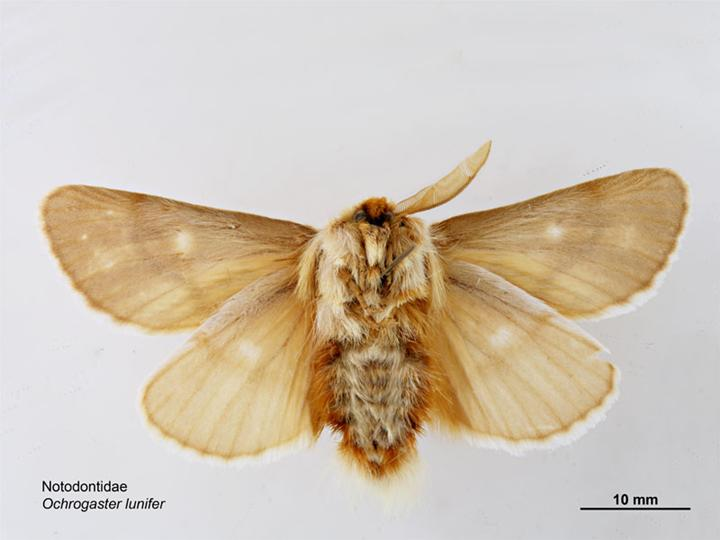
Mounted adult, ventral view

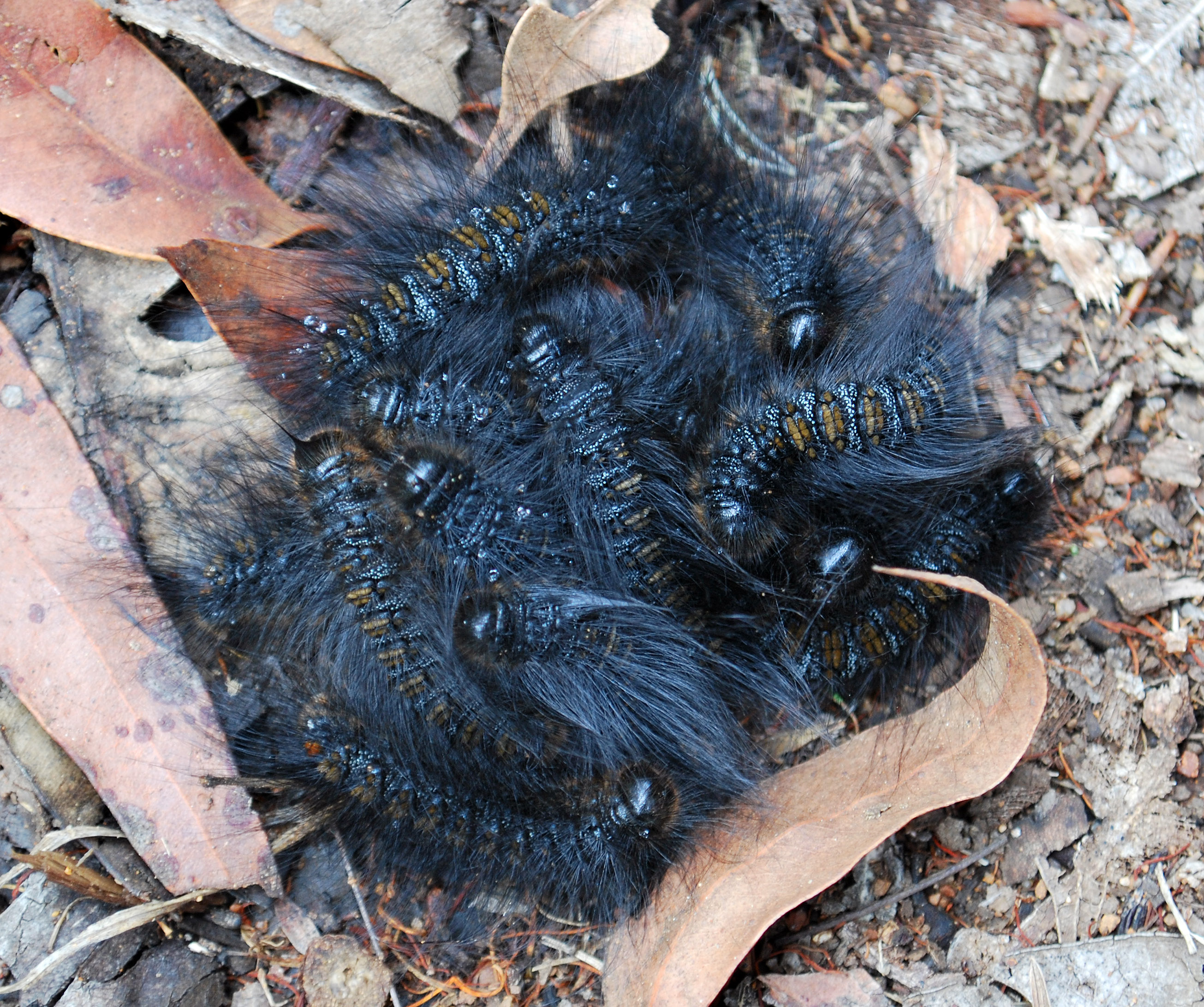
Ochrogaster lunifer curling up into a ball for protection

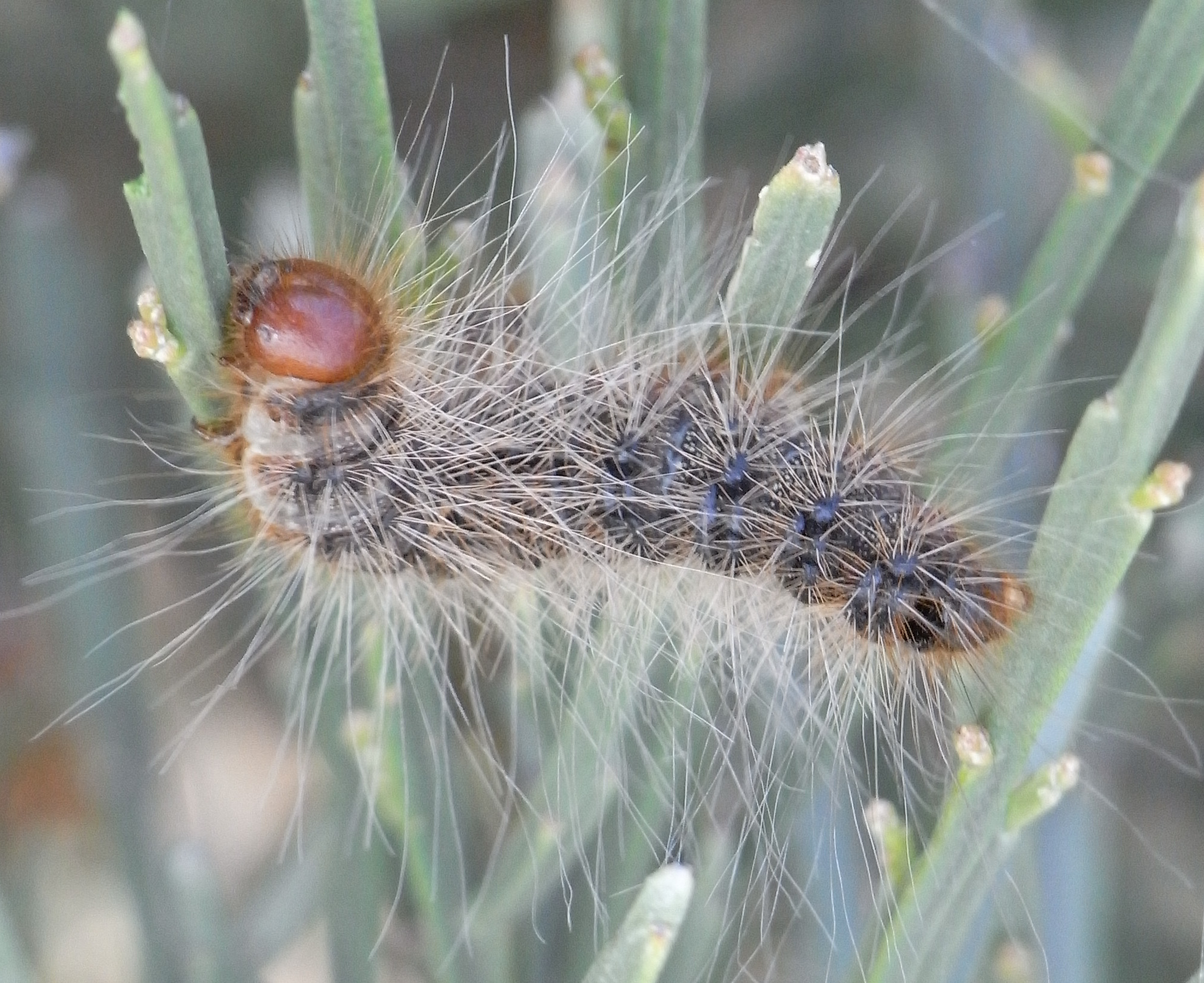
Larva

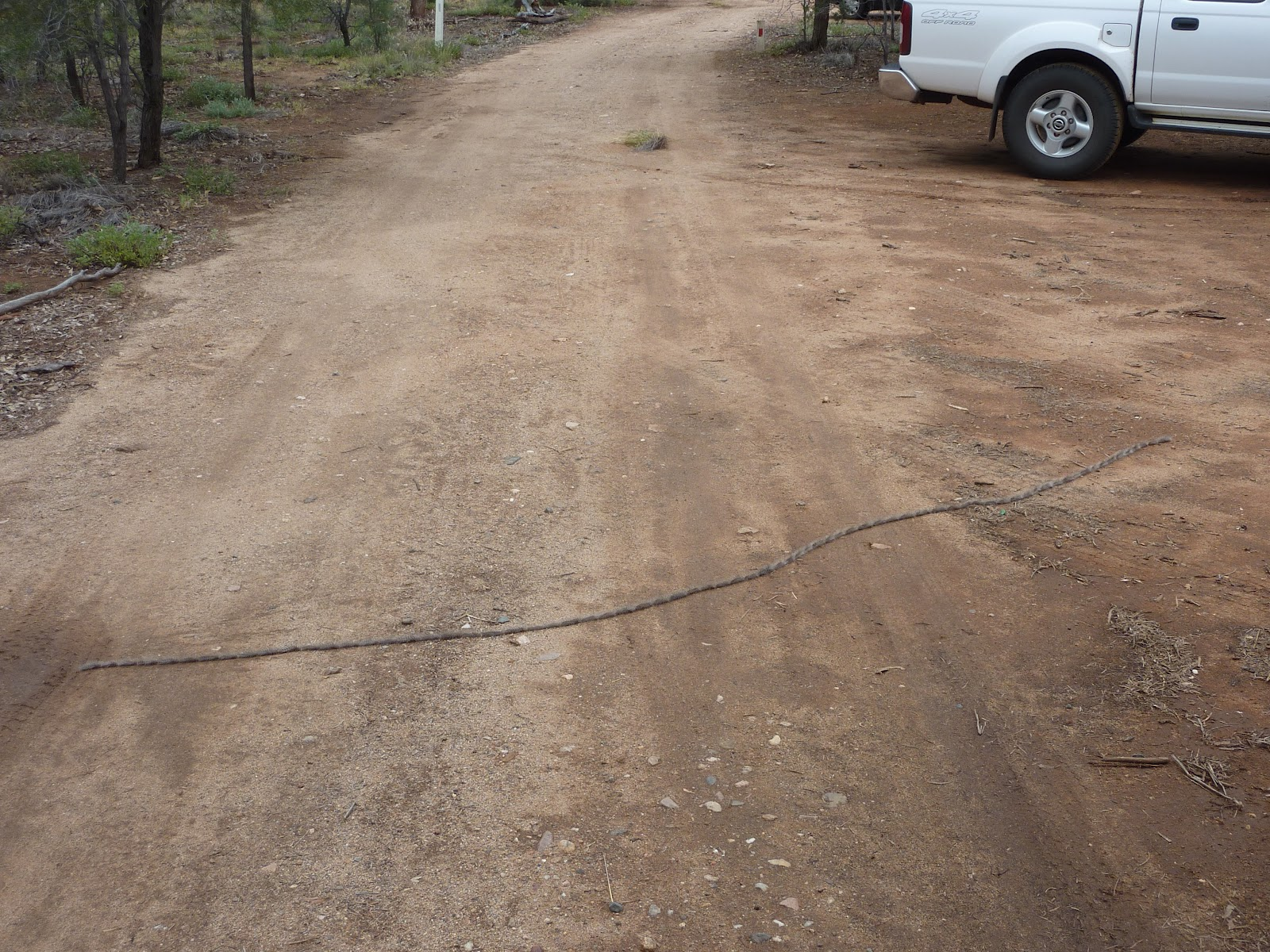
Travelling in a line

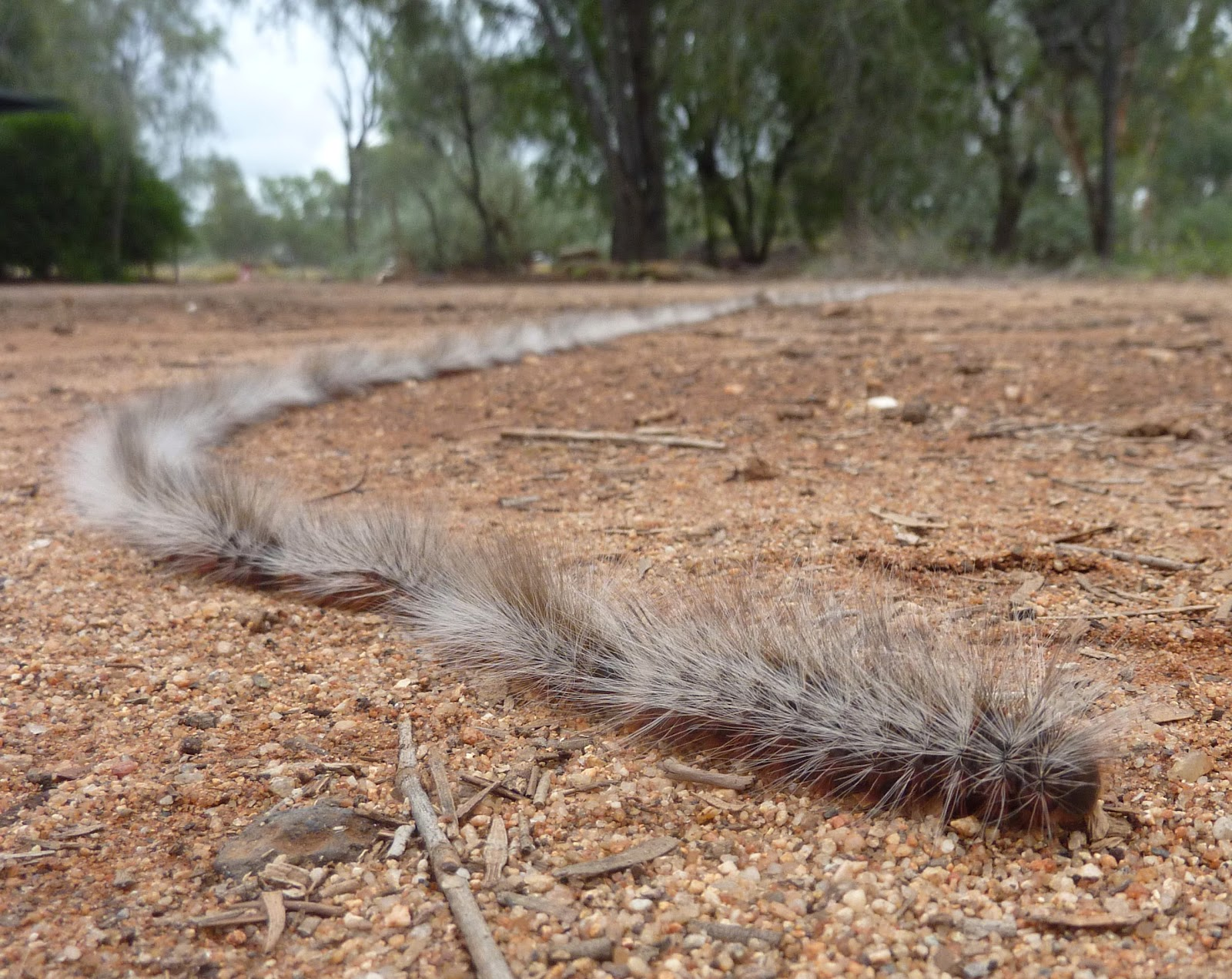
Travelling in a line

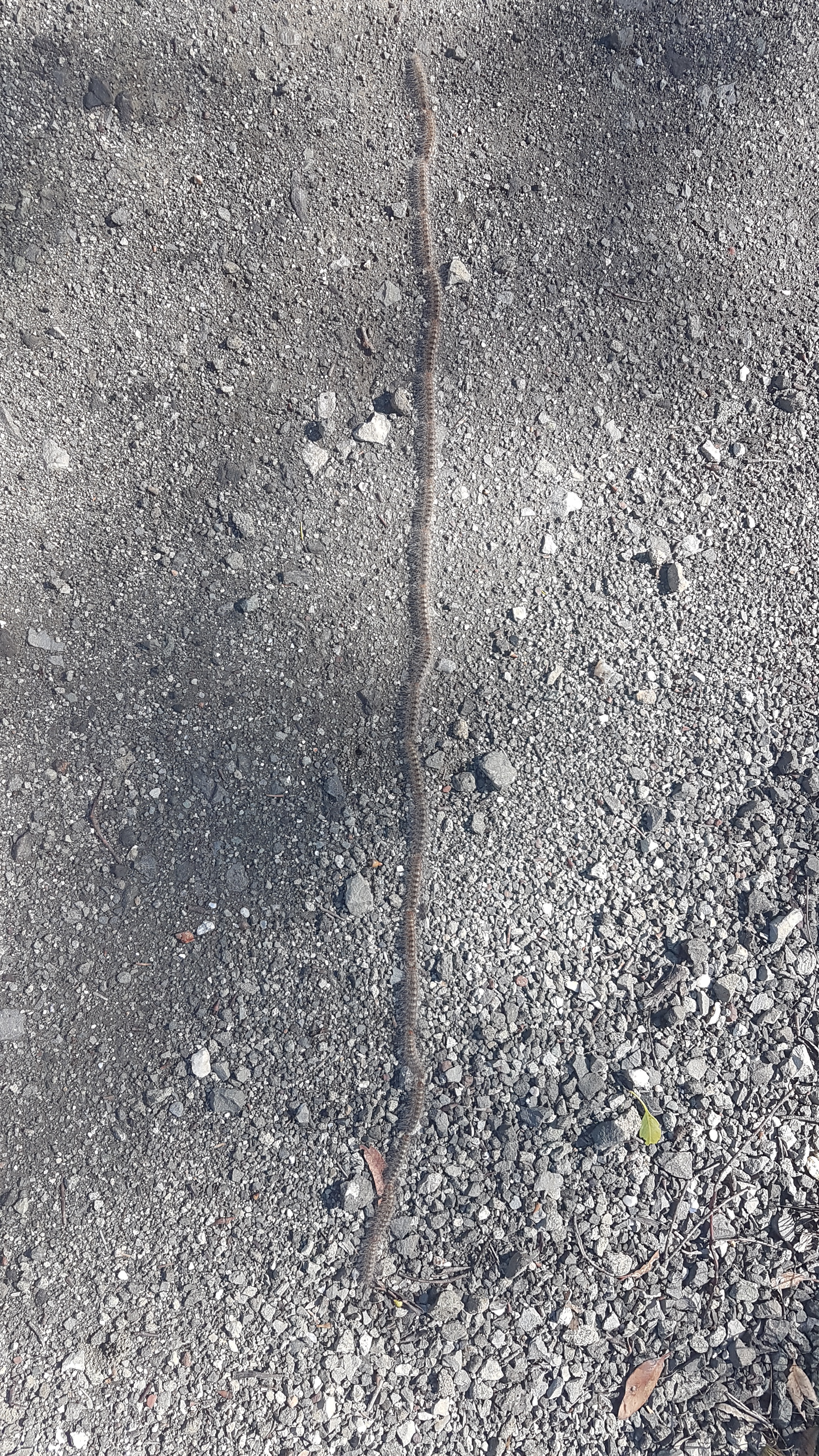
Ochrogaster lunifer procession

== See also ==
- Comparison of butterflies and moths
- Thaumetopoeinae (processionary moths)
