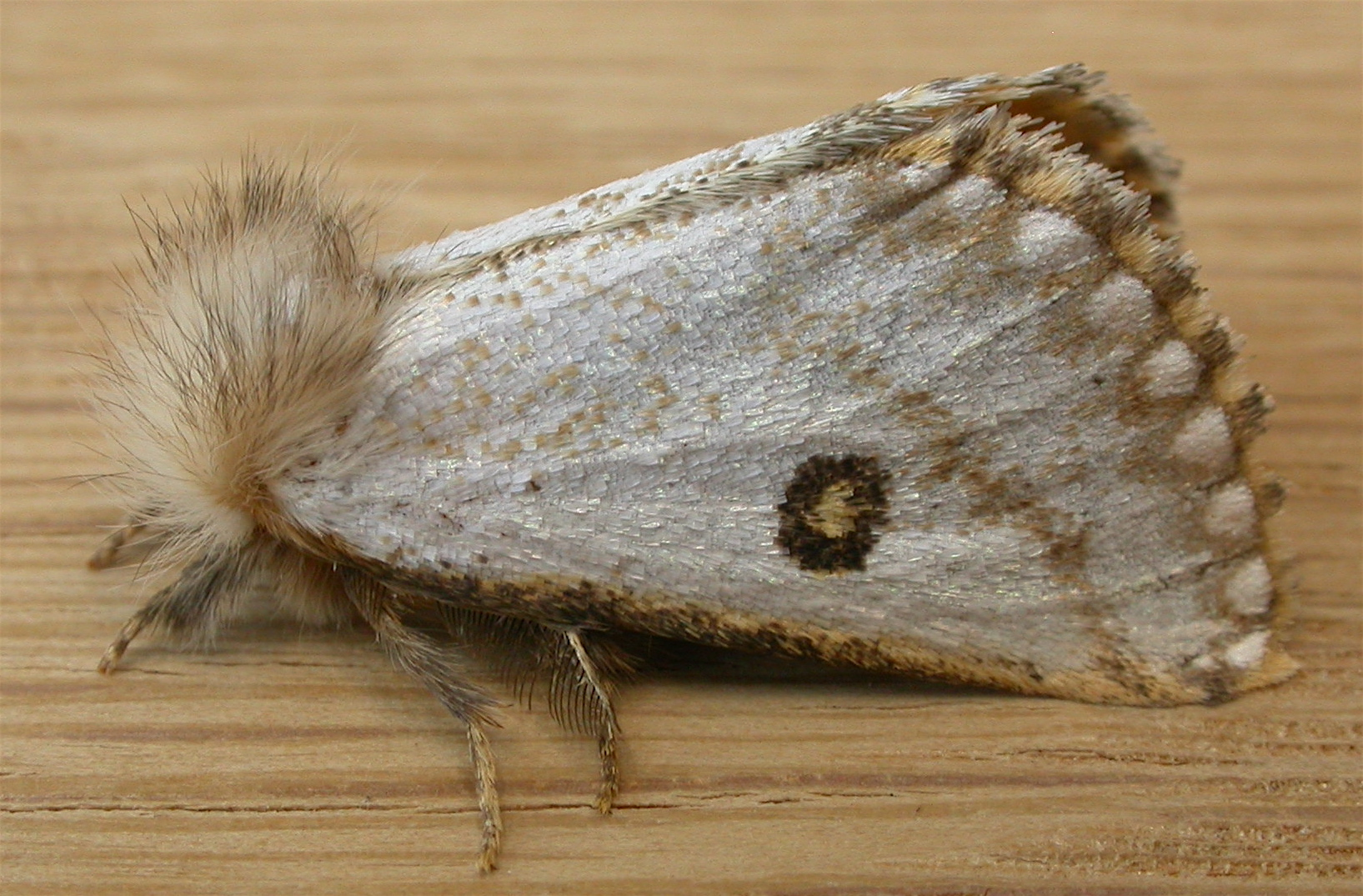

Scientific classification
- Kingdom: Animalia
- Phylum: Arthropoda
- Class: Insecta
- Order: Lepidoptera
- Superfamily: Noctuoidea
- Family: Notodontidae
- Genus: Epicoma
- Species: E. melanosticta

Binomial name
- Epicoma melanosticta Donovan, 1805

Synonyms
- Eriogaster incompta

= Epicoma melanosticta =

Species of moth

Epicoma melanosticta is a moth of the family Notodontidae first described by Edward Donovan in 1805. It is found in Australia, including Tasmania.

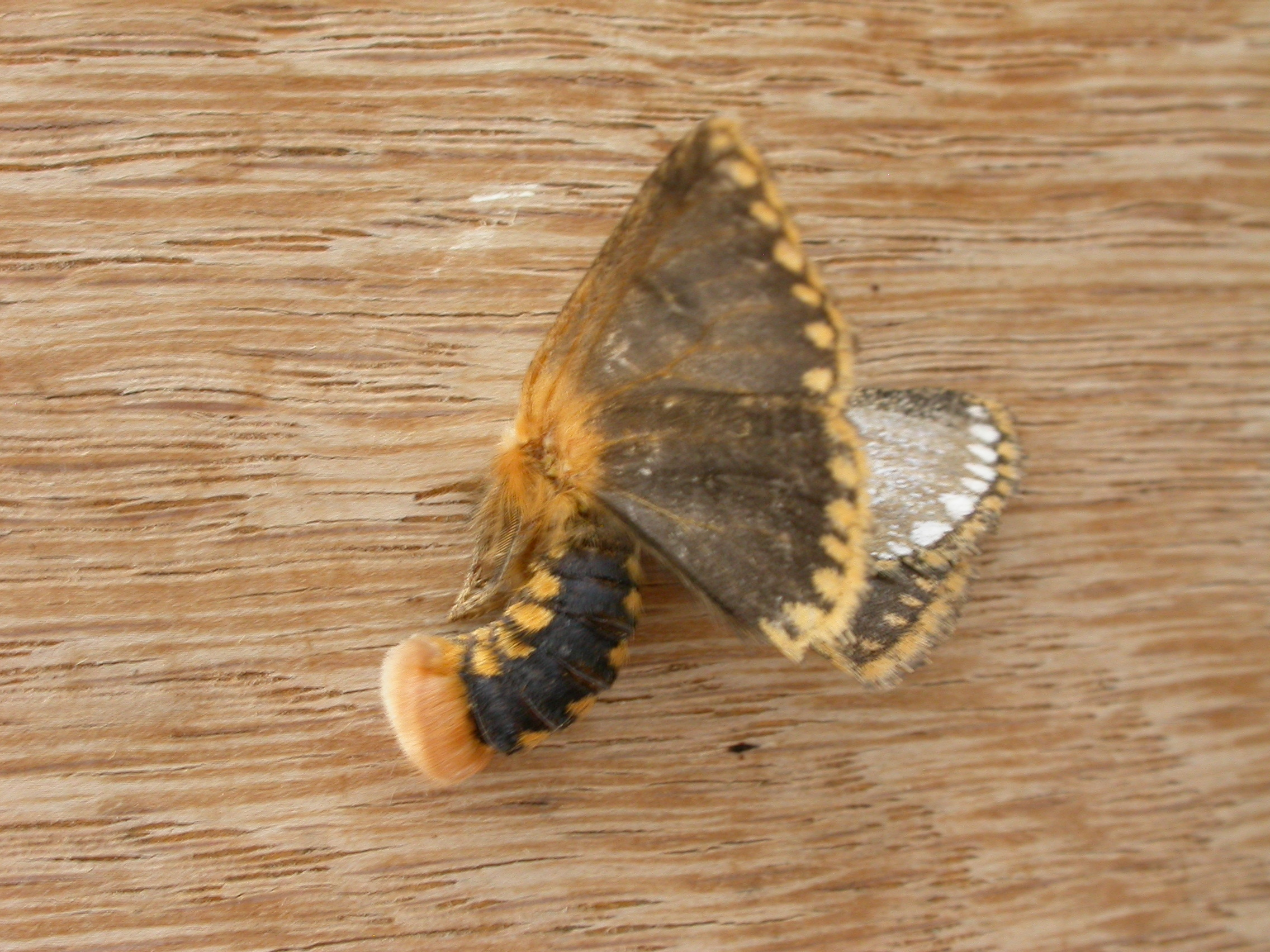

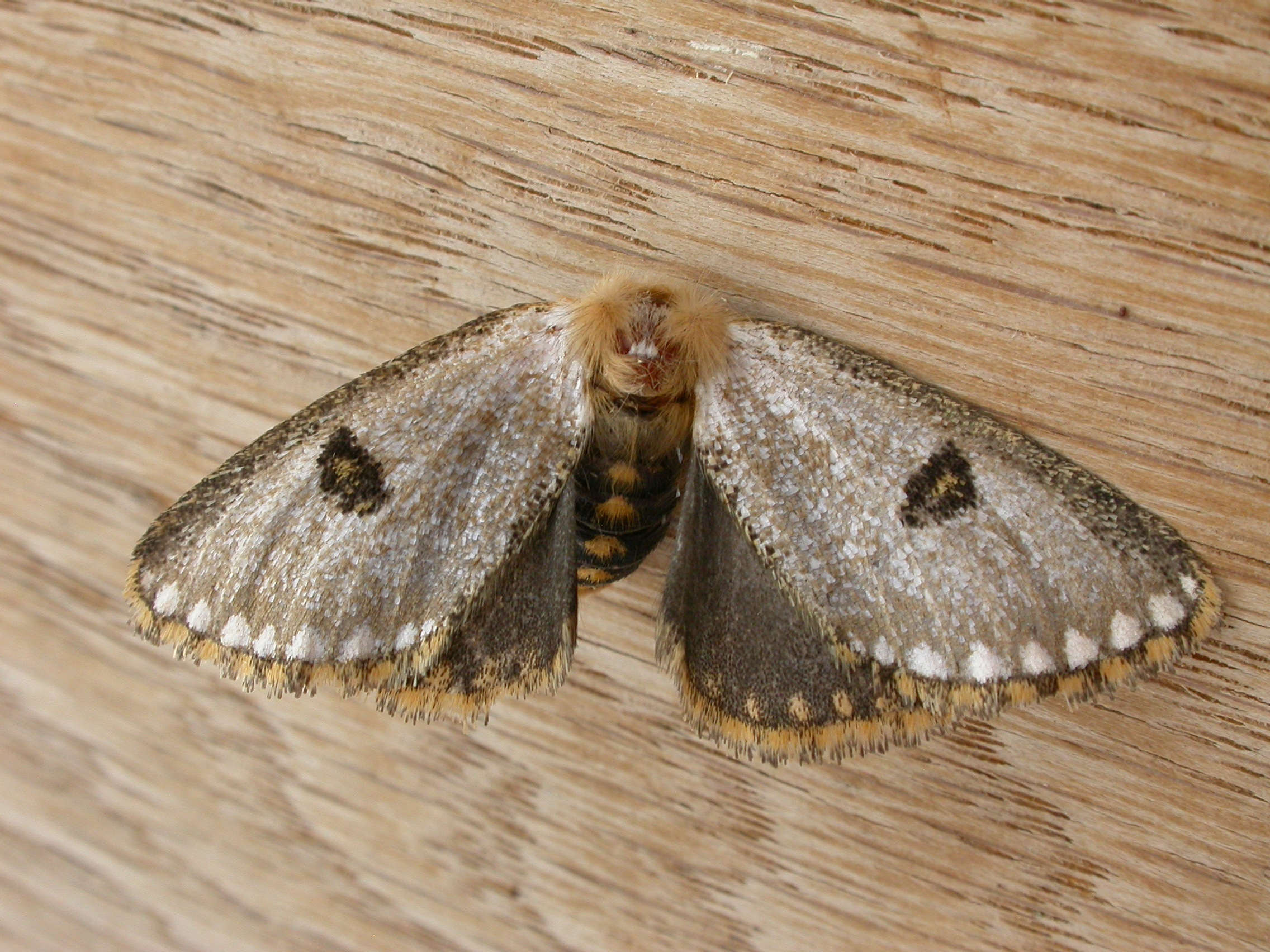

The wingspan is about 30 mm.

The larvae feed on Calothamnus validus, Calothamnus homalophyllus and Leptospermum species.
