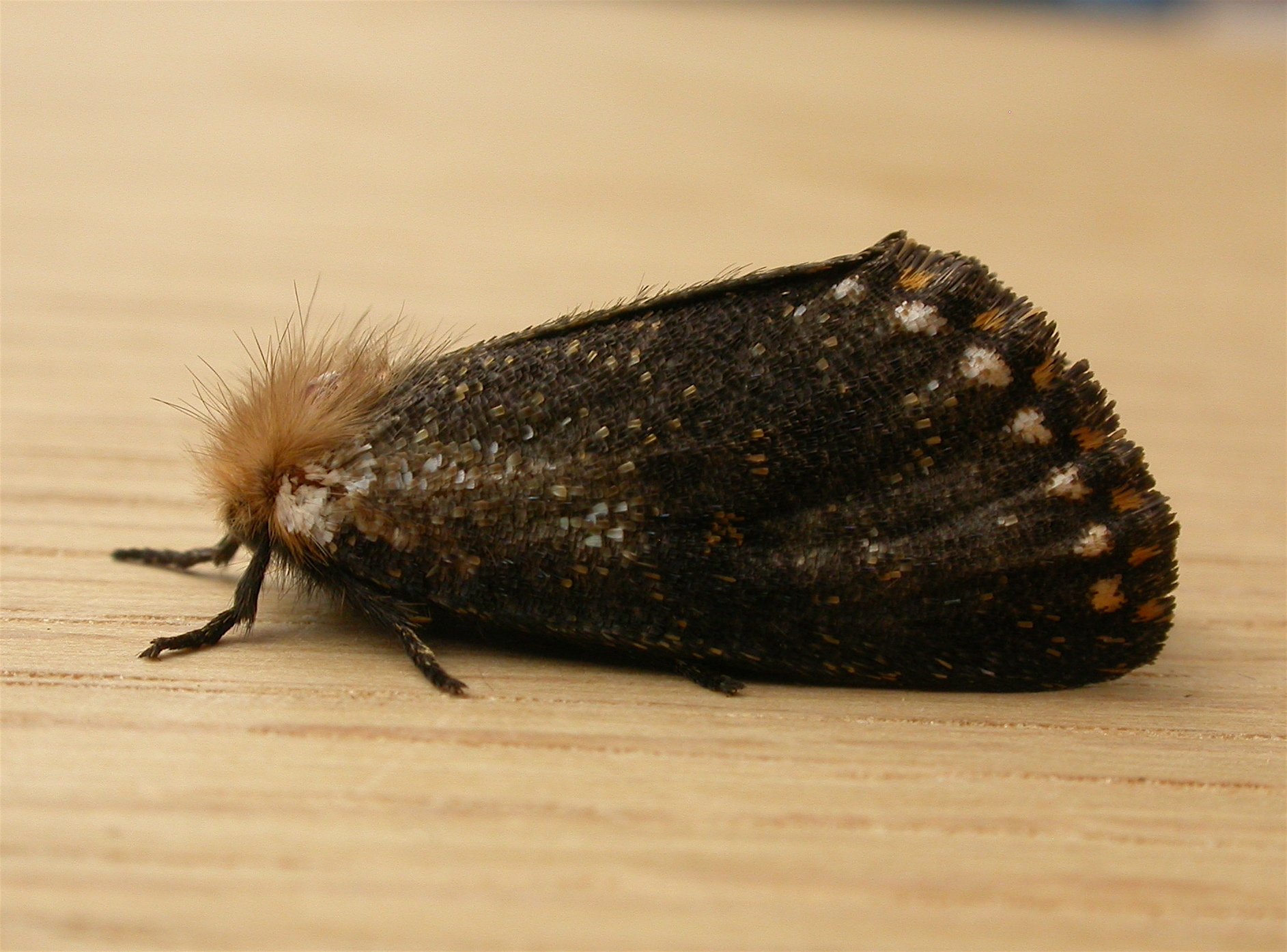

Scientific classification
- Kingdom: Animalia
- Phylum: Arthropoda
- Class: Insecta
- Order: Lepidoptera
- Superfamily: Noctuoidea
- Family: Notodontidae
- Genus: Epicoma
- Species: E. tristis

Binomial name
- Epicoma tristis Donovan, 1805

Synonyms
- Marane tristis

= Epicoma tristis =

Species of moth

Epicoma tristis, the dark epicoma, is a moth of the family Notodontidae first described by Edward Donovan in 1805. It is found in Australia.

The larvae feed on Eucalyptus, Leptospermum and Kunzea species.
