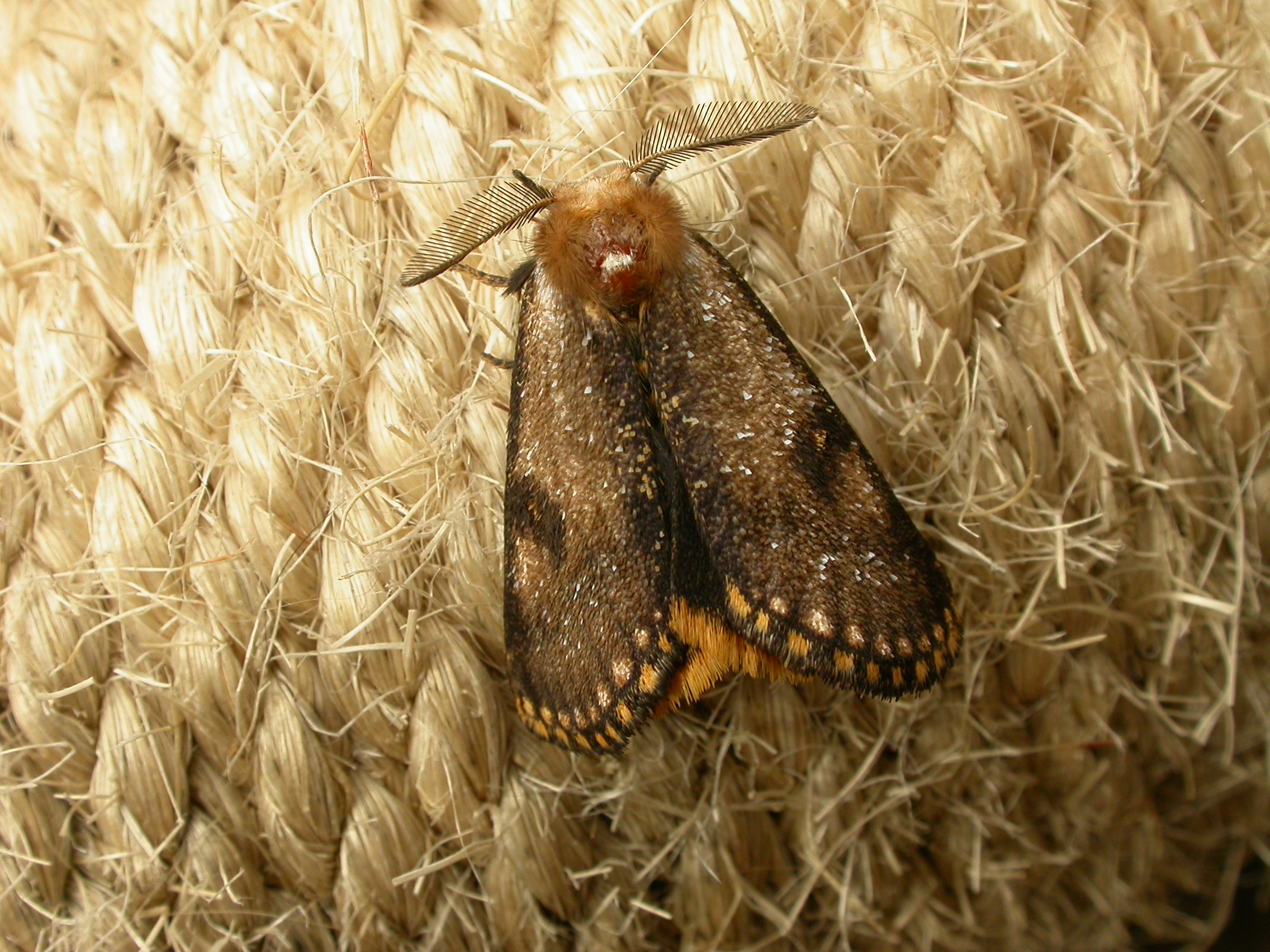

Scientific classification
- Kingdom: Animalia
- Phylum: Arthropoda
- Clade: Pancrustacea
- Class: Insecta
- Order: Lepidoptera
- Superfamily: Noctuoidea
- Family: Notodontidae
- Genus: Epicoma
- Species: E. contristis

Binomial name
- Epicoma contristis Hübner, 1823

Synonyms
- Bombyx contristis Lewin, 1805; Epicoma tristis Hübner, 1819; Epicoma contristis Hübner, 1823

= Epicoma contristis =

Species of moth

Epicoma contristis, the yellow-spotted epicoma, is a moth of the family Notodontidae first described by Jacob Hübner in 1823. It is known from Australia, including Tasmania, New South Wales and Victoria.

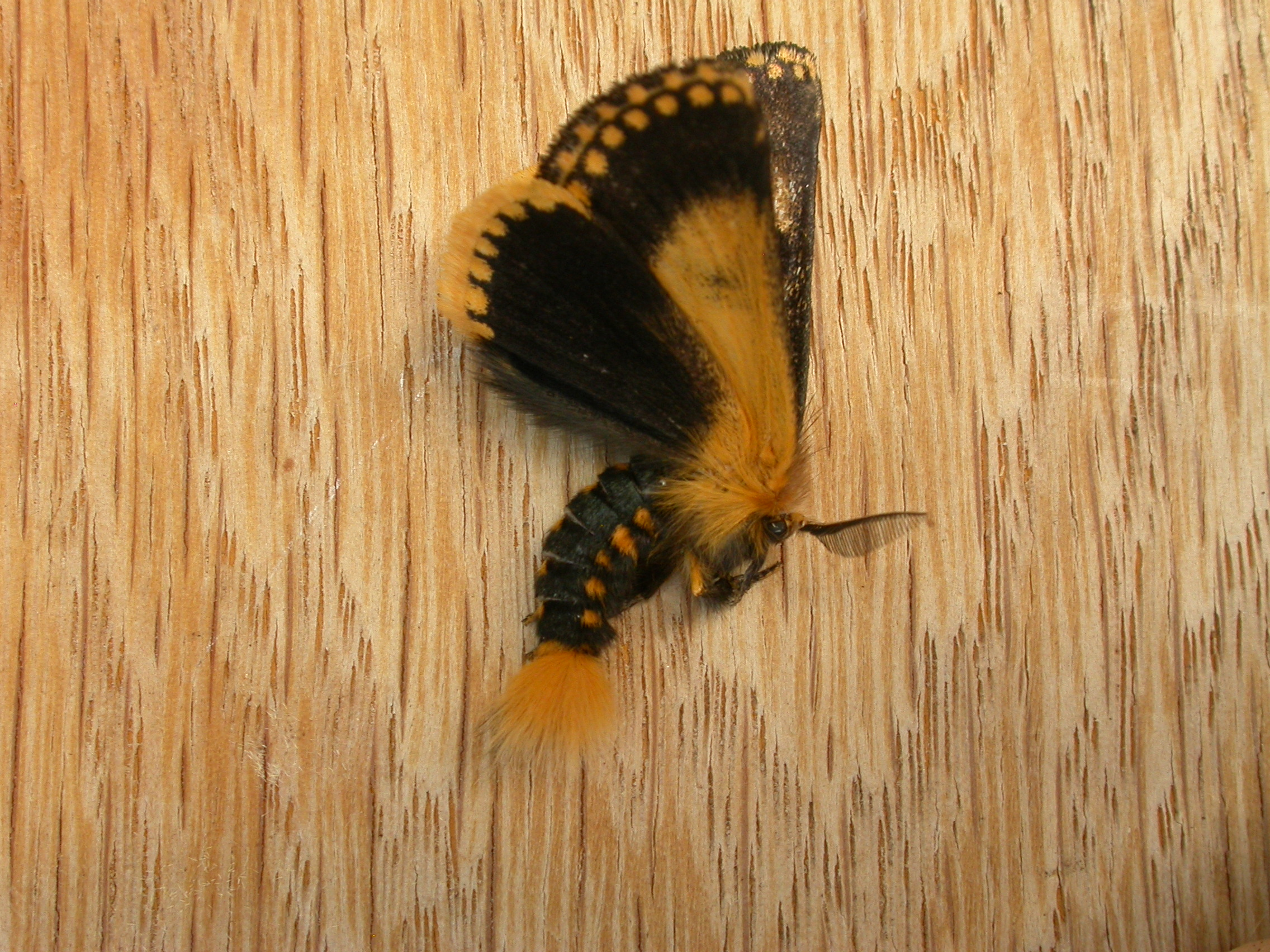
Adult playing dead

The larvae feed on the foliage of Casuarina, Eucalyptus, Leptospermum and Melaleuca species.
