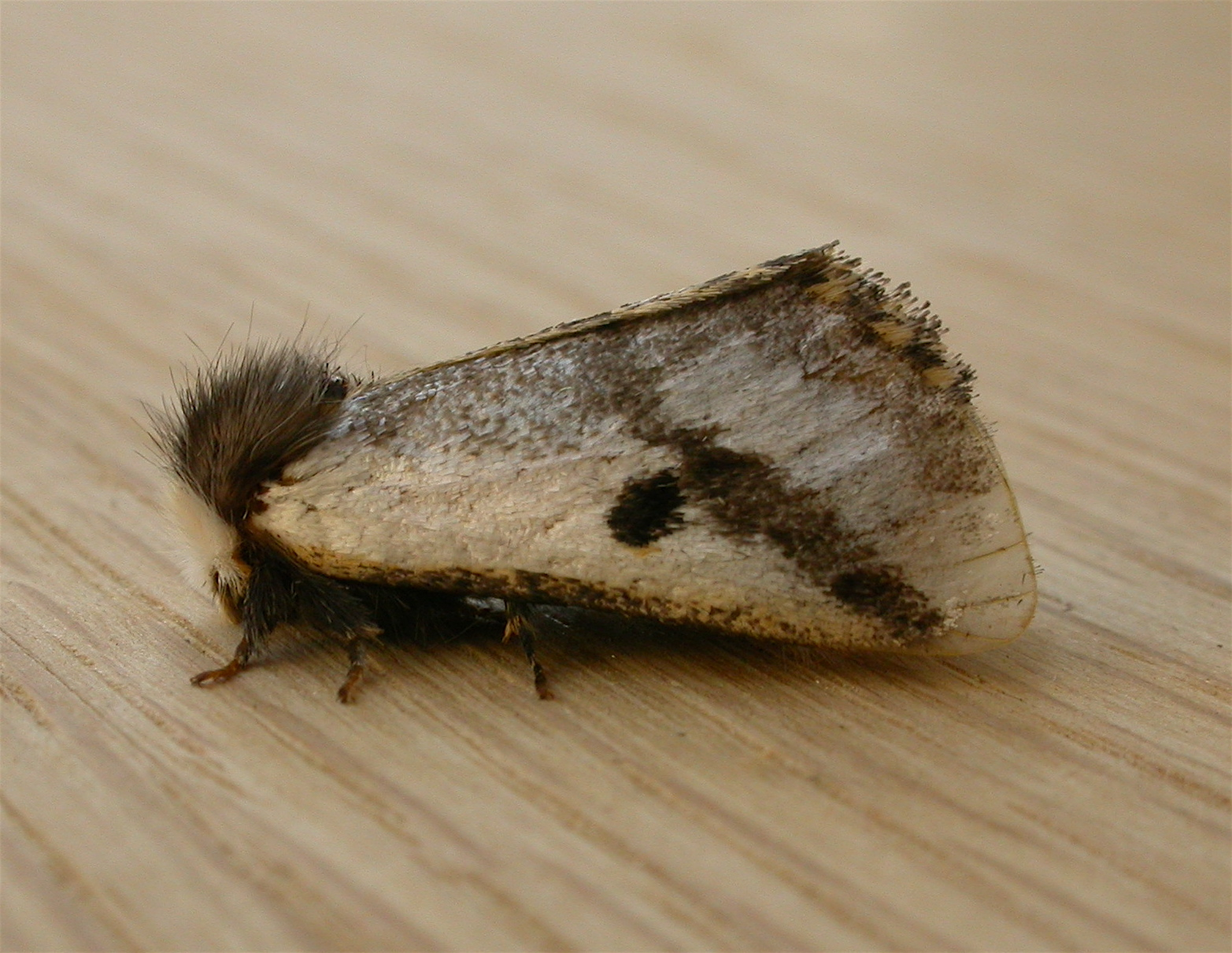

Scientific classification
- Kingdom: Animalia
- Phylum: Arthropoda
- Clade: Pancrustacea
- Class: Insecta
- Order: Lepidoptera
- Superfamily: Noctuoidea
- Family: Notodontidae
- Genus: Epicoma
- Species: E. melanospila

Binomial name
- Epicoma melanospila Wallengren, 1860

Synonyms
- Marane walkeri

= Epicoma melanospila =

Species of moth

Epicoma melanospila, the black spot moth, is a moth of the family Notodontidae. It was first described by Wallengren in 1860 and it is found in Australia.

The larvae feed on Callistemon, Eucalyptus, Leptospermum and Kunzea species.
