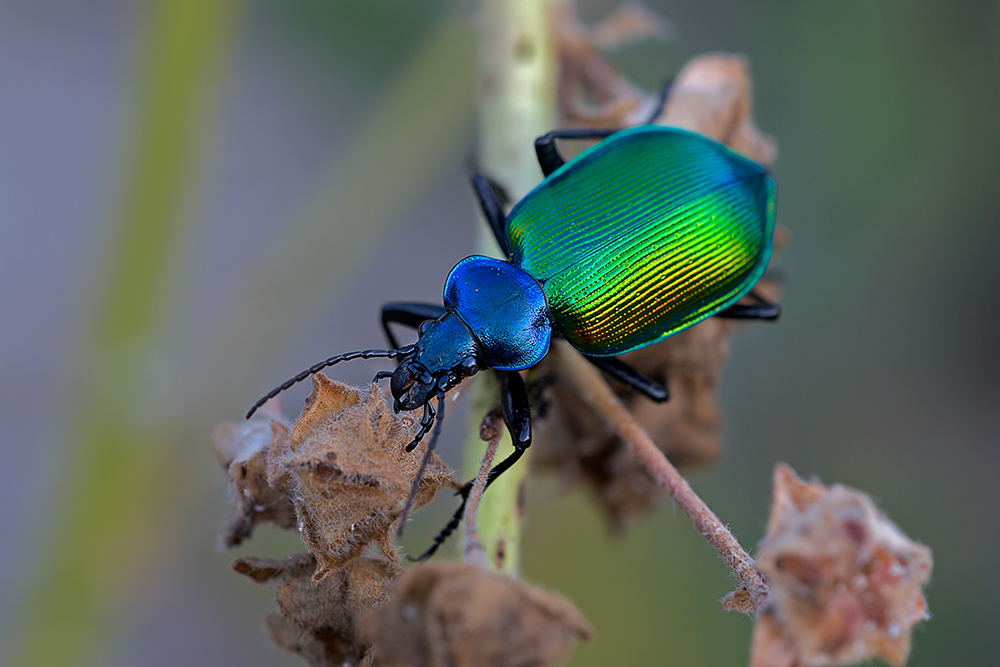

Scientific classification
- Kingdom: Animalia
- Phylum: Arthropoda
- Class: Insecta
- Order: Coleoptera
- Suborder: Adephaga
- Family: Carabidae
- Genus: Calosoma
- Species: C. sycophanta

Binomial name
- Calosoma sycophanta (Linnaeus, 1758)

Synonyms
- Carabus sycophanta Linnaeus, 1758; Calosoma azureum Letzner, 1850; Calosoma cupreum Letzner, 1850; Calosoma marginatum Letzner, 1850; Calosoma nigrocyaneum Letzner, 1850; Calosoma purpureoaureum Letzner, 1850; Calosoma severum Chaudoir, 1850; Callipara rapax Motschulsky, 1866; Calosoma smaragdynum G.Rossi, 1882; Calosoma habelmanni Schilsky, 1888; Calosoma purpureipenne Reitter, 1891; Calosoma corvinum Heller, 1897; Calosoma anthracinum Houlbert, 1907; Calosoma prasinum Lapouge, 1907; Calosoma solinfectum Jännichen, 1914; Calosoma lapougei Breuning, 1927; Calosoma nigrosuturale Jacquet, 1930; Calosoma nigroaeneum Polentz, 1937

= Calosoma sycophanta =

Species of beetle

Calosoma sycophanta, the forest caterpillar hunter, is a species of ground beetle belonging to the family Carabidae.

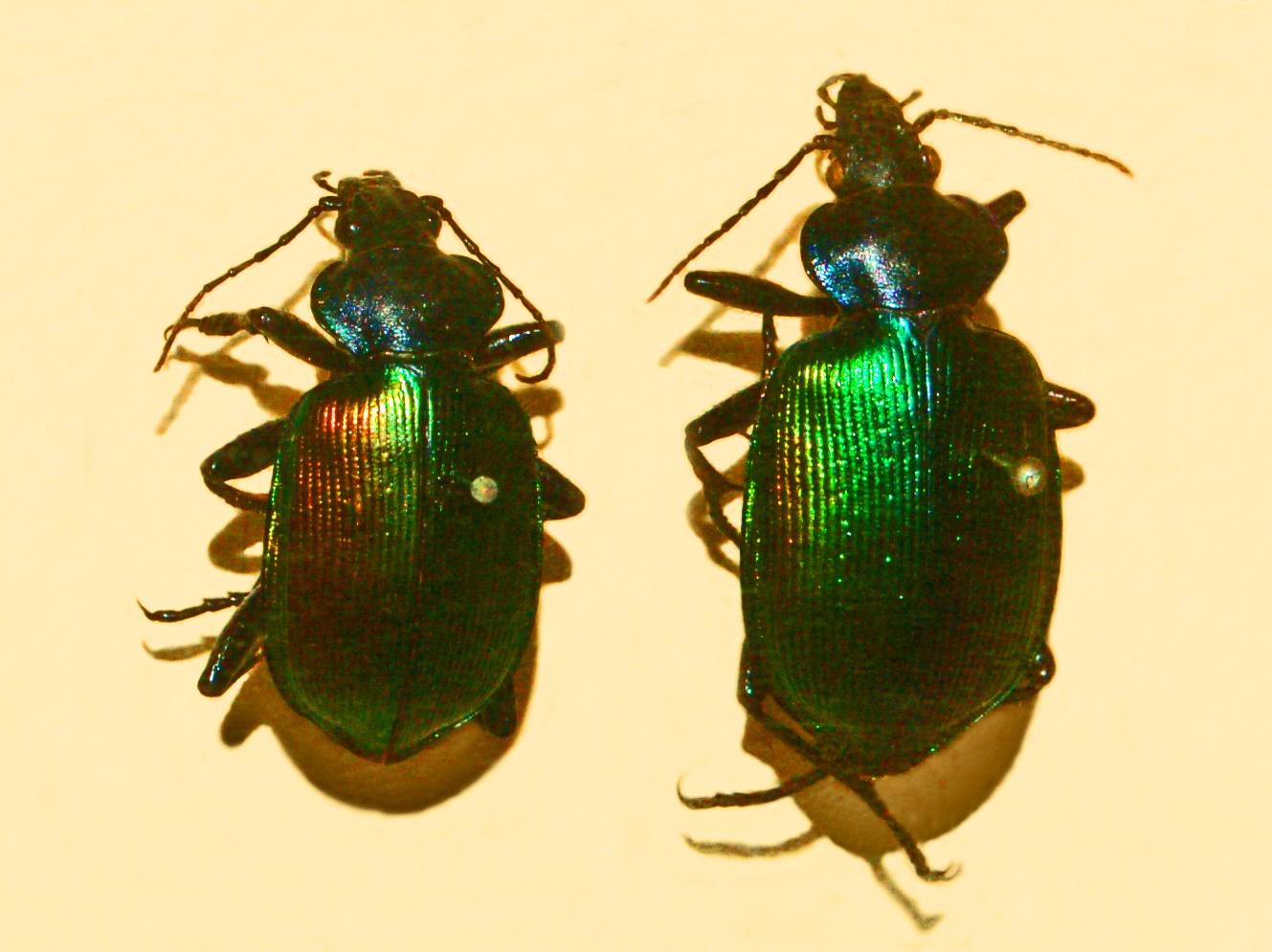
Calosoma sycophanta, male and female. Mounted specimen

== Subspecies and varietas ==
- Calosoma sycophanta var. severum Chaudoir, 1850
- Calosoma sycophanta var. nigrocyaneum Letzner, 1850
- Calosoma sycophanta var. marginatum Letzner, 1850
- Calosoma sycophanta var. azureum Letzner, 1850
- Calosoma sycophanta var. purpureoaureum Letzner, 1850
- Calosoma sycophanta var. cupreum Letzner, 1850
- Callipara sycophanta rapax Motschoulsky, 1865
- Calosoma sycophanta var. smaragdinum Rossi, 1882
- Calosoma sycophanta var. habelmanni Schilsky, 1888
- Calosoma sycophanta var. purpuripenne Reitter, 1891
- Calosoma sycophanta prasinum Lapouge, 1907
- Calosoma sycophanta var. lapougei Breuning, 1927
- Calosoma sycophanta nigrosuturale Jaquet, 1930
- Calosoma sycophanta nigroaeneum Polentz, 1937

== Description ==
Calosoma sycophanta can reach a length of about 21–35 millimetres (0.83–1.38 in). This large ground beetle has characteristic metallic bright green elytra, while scutellum is metallic bluish. The head is black. These colours have iridescent shades that change (green, blue, bronze, copper, gold black) according to the direction and quality of light. Pronotum is transverse shaped, posteriorly sharply narrowed, wrinkled and punctured. Elytra are flattened with clearly visible punctures in the striae.

== Behavior ==
This ground beetle is a voracious consumer of caterpillars (especially Lymantria dispar, Thaumetopoea processionea, Thaumetopoea pityocampa and Euproctis chrysorrhoea) during both its larval stage and as an adult.

As a predator the species has been researched for the effect of its predation upon the caterpillars with microsporidian pathogens, finding a preference for Vairimorpha disparis infected larva.

It is a diurnal beetle and both adults and larvae live in trees.

== Distribution ==
This species is native to Europe. It is present in most European countries, in the eastern Palearctic realm, in the Nearctic realm, in the Near East, and in North Africa. In 1905 it was imported to New England for control of the gypsy moth.

== Gallery ==
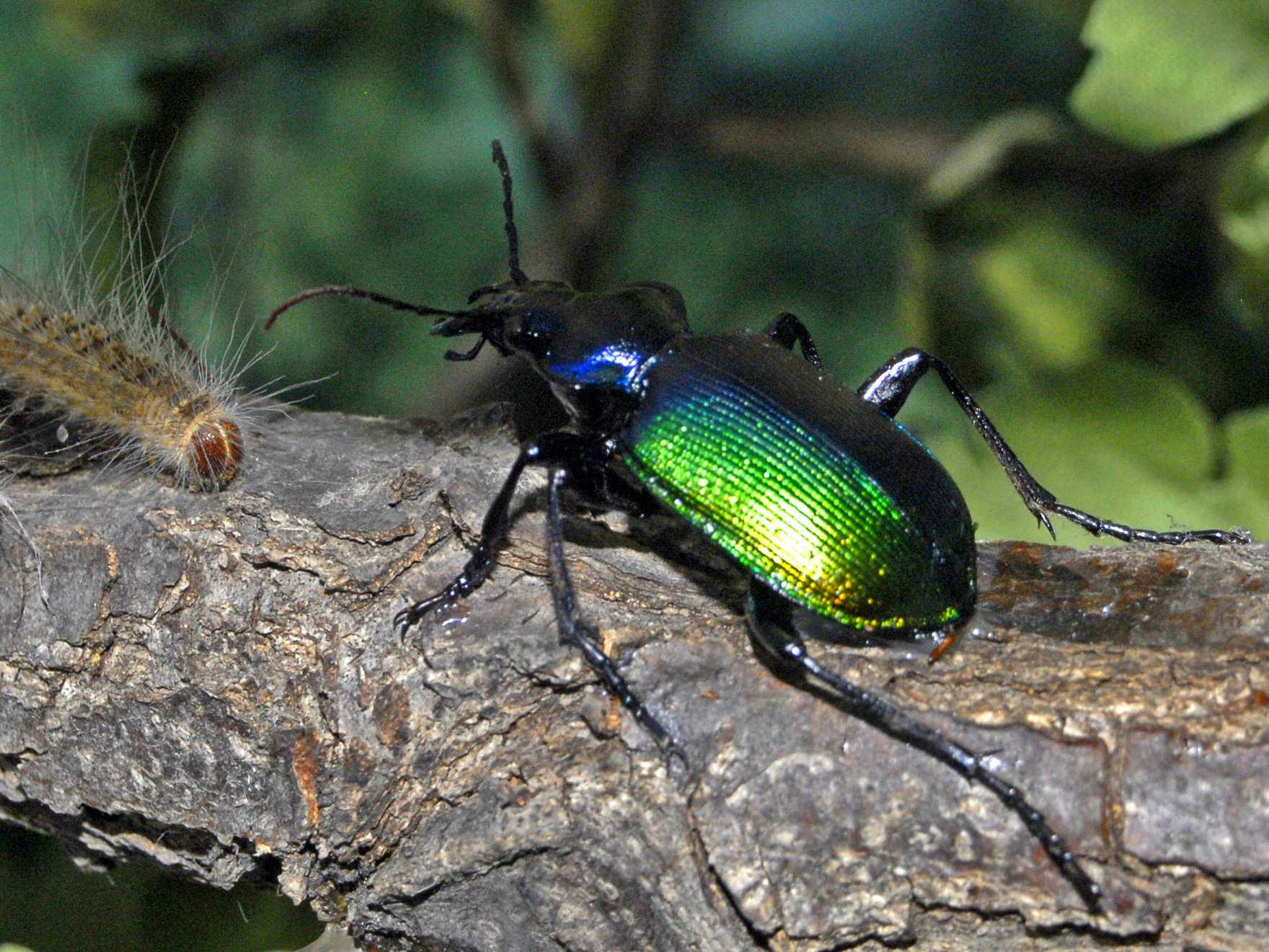
Adult of Calosoma sycophanta preying on a caterpillar of Lymantria dispar

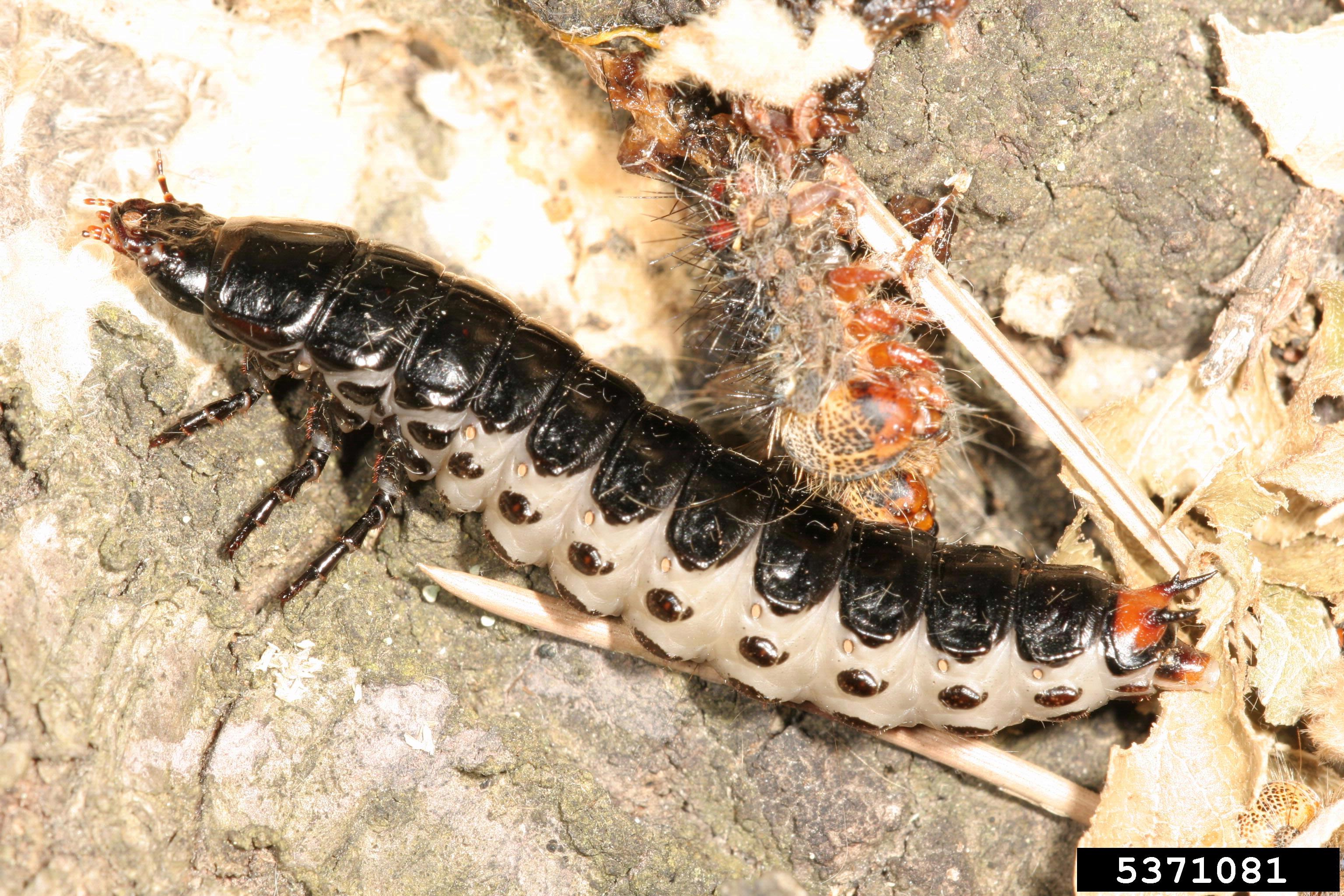
Calosoma sycophanta, larva

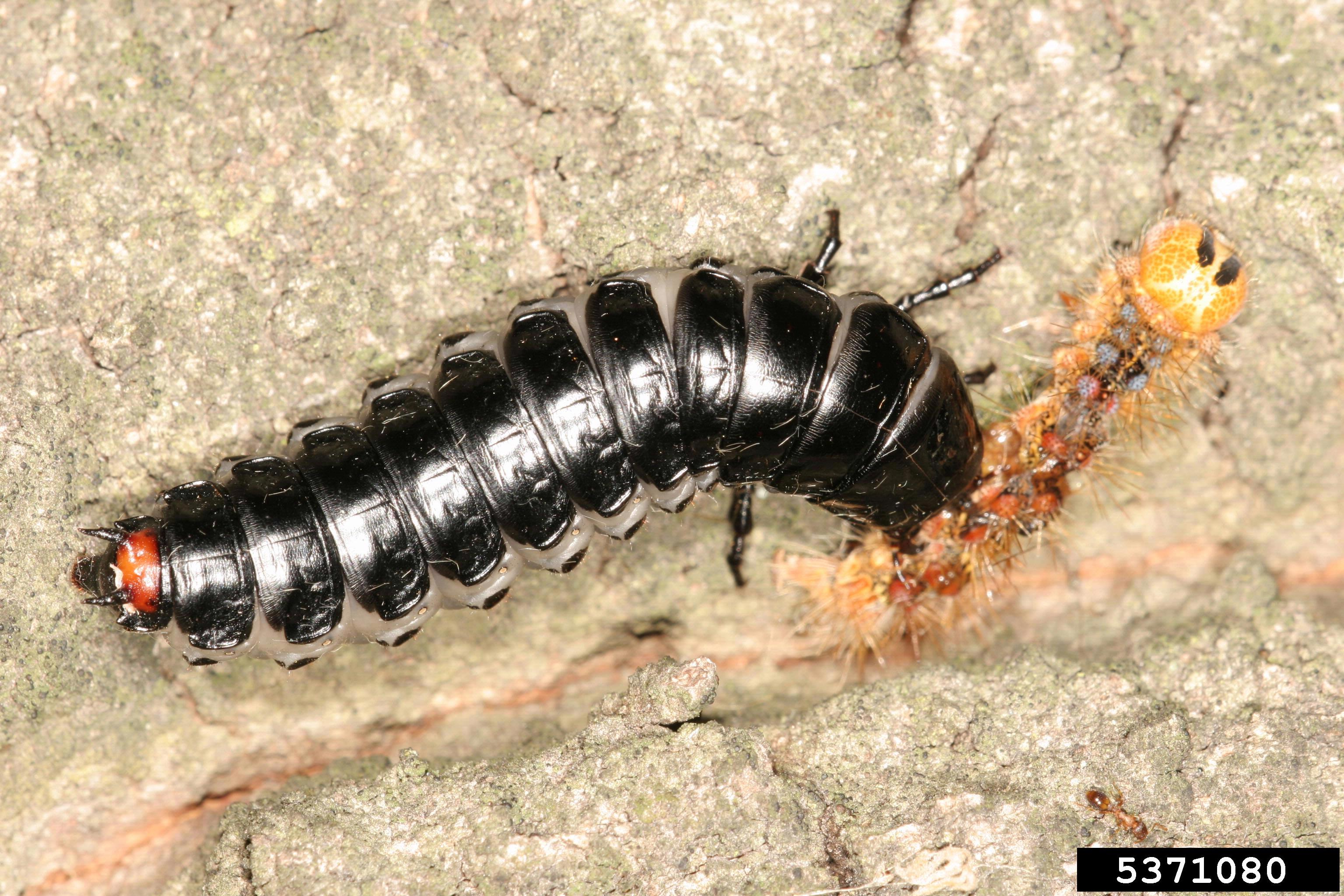
Calosoma sycophanta larva eating a Lymantria dispar larva

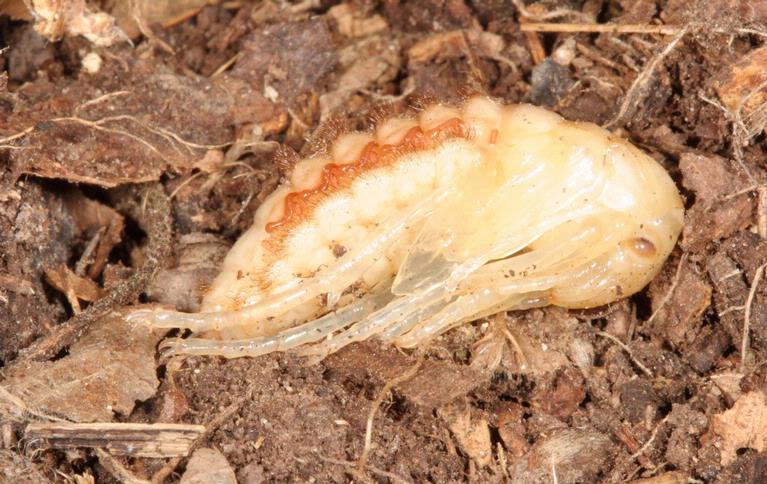
Calosoma sycophanta, pupa
