= Letzner =

Letzner is a German surname. Notable persons with the surname include:

- Johannes Letzner (1531–1613), German priest
- Karl Wilhelm Letzner (1812–1889), German teacher and entomologist
