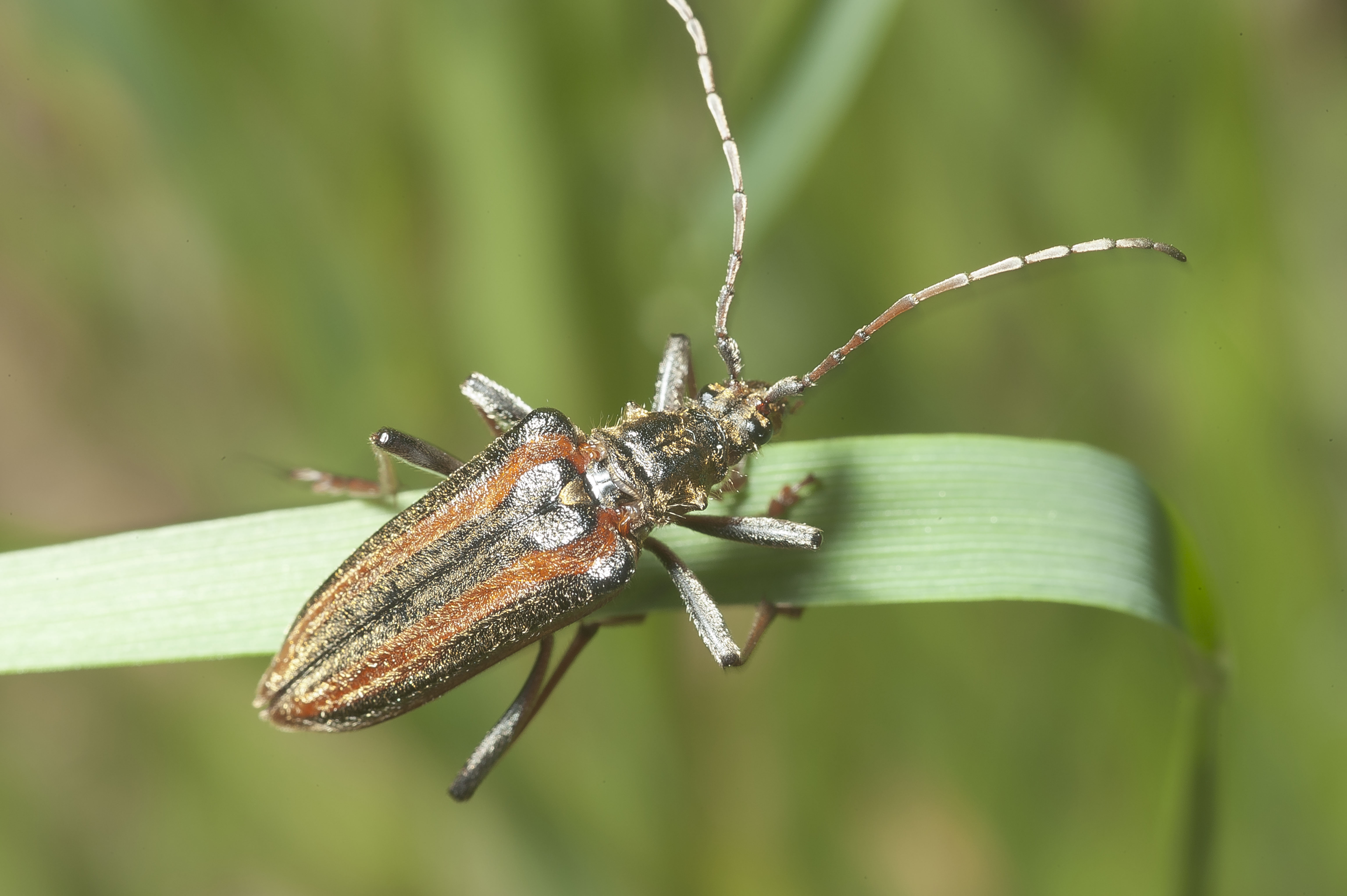

Scientific classification
- Kingdom: Animalia
- Phylum: Arthropoda
- Class: Insecta
- Order: Coleoptera
- Suborder: Polyphaga
- Infraorder: Cucujiformia
- Family: Cerambycidae
- Genus: Oxymirus
- Species: O. cursor

Binomial name
- Oxymirus cursor (Linnaeus, 1758)

Synonyms
- Cerambyx cursor Linnaeus, 1758; Cerambyx noctis Gmelin, 1790; Rhagium cursor (Linnaeus) Fabricius, 1801; Rhagium noctis (Gmelin) Fabricius; Stenocorus cursor (Linnaeus) Olivier, 1795; Stenocorus noctis (Gmelin) Olivier, 1795; Stenocorus striatus Voet, 1806; Toxotus cursor (Linnaeus) Mulsant, 1839; Toxotus lacordairei Pascoe, 1867

= Oxymirus cursor =

Species of beetle

Oxymirus cursor is the species of the Lepturinae subfamily in long-horned beetle family. This beetle is distributed in Austria, Belgium, Bulgaria, Croatia, Czech Republic, Denmark, Finland, France, Germany, Hungary, Italy, Luxembourg, Norway, Pakistan, Poland, Romania, Russia, Serbia, Slovakia, Slovenia, Spain, Sweden, and in Switzerland. Adult beetle feeds on European larch, silver fir, and Norway spruce.

== Subtaxons ==
There are three varietets in species:

- Oxymirus cursor var. lineatus Letzner, 1885
- Oxymirus cursor var. nigrinus Reitter, 1905
- Oxymirus cursor var. verneuili Mulsant, 1838
