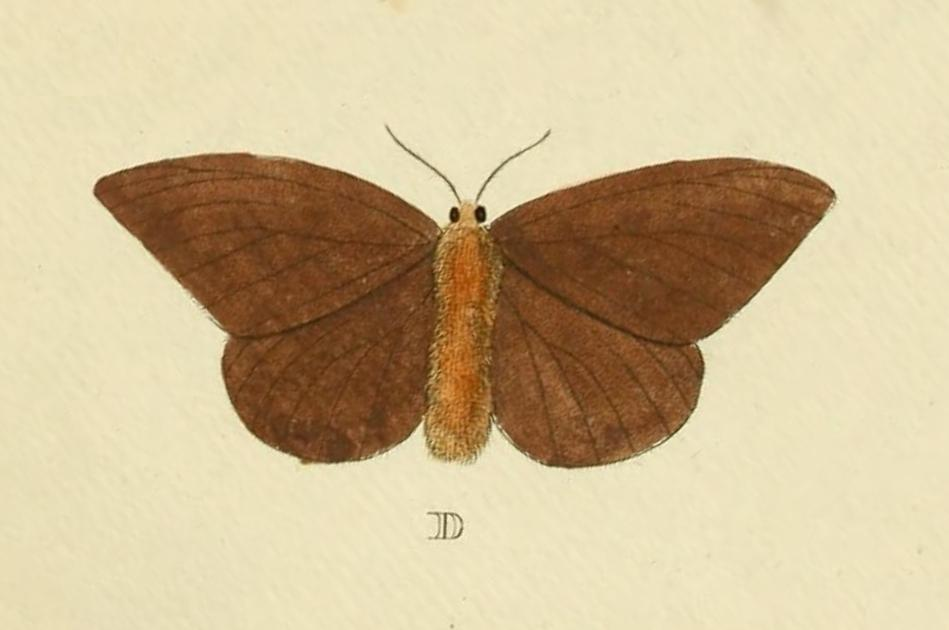

Scientific classification
- Kingdom: Animalia
- Phylum: Arthropoda
- Clade: Pancrustacea
- Class: Insecta
- Order: Lepidoptera
- Family: Saturniidae
- Genus: Hylesia
- Species: H. metabus

Binomial name
- Hylesia metabus (Cramer, 1775)

Synonyms
- Phalaena metabus Cramer, 1775; Bombyx metabus (Cramer, 1775); Hylesia boarmia Hübner, 1822; Hylesia caripitox Orfila, 1952; Hylesia fusifascia Walker, 1862; Hylesia grisoli Draudt, 1929; Hylesia obsoleta Cramer, 1780; Hylesia urticans Floch & Abbonenc, 1944

= Yellowtail moth =

Species of moth

The yellowtail moth or ashen moth (Hylesia metabus) is a species of moth found in northeastern South America. Contact with the urticating hairs of adult female moths is known to cause a cutaneous condition called the Caripito itch. The species was first described by Pieter Cramer in 1775.

These moths are mainly found along the mangrove swamps of Venezuela and Guyana. The adult moths however swarm to lights in nearby towns and the urticating hairs are released into the air leading to severe urticarial and papulovesicular dermatitis. Hairs from male moths do not cause any symptoms.

These special hairs are used by the females to protect their egg masses from predators such as ants.
