= Thaumetopoein =

Urticating protein

Thaumetopoein is an urticating protein found in the hairs and integument of the caterpillars of the pine processionary (Thaumetopoea pityocampa) and oak processionary (Thaumetopoea processionea).

It was first identified in 1986 by a group of French scientists at the University of Bordeaux. Attempting to understand the mechanisms responsible for the strong cutaneous reactions provoked when in contact with the caterpillar, the researchers extracted the proteins from the caterpillars' setae. They subsequently isolated thaumetopoein, a small protein formed of two subunits of approximately 13,000 and 15,000 daltons.

Little substantial research has been conducted since the protein's identification. In 2003, Spanish researches analyzed the protein and were able to isolate and identified a major constituent allergen with a molecular weight around 15,000 daltons, which they named Tha p 1. In 2012, a separate group of researchers identified a second component, Tha p 2.
