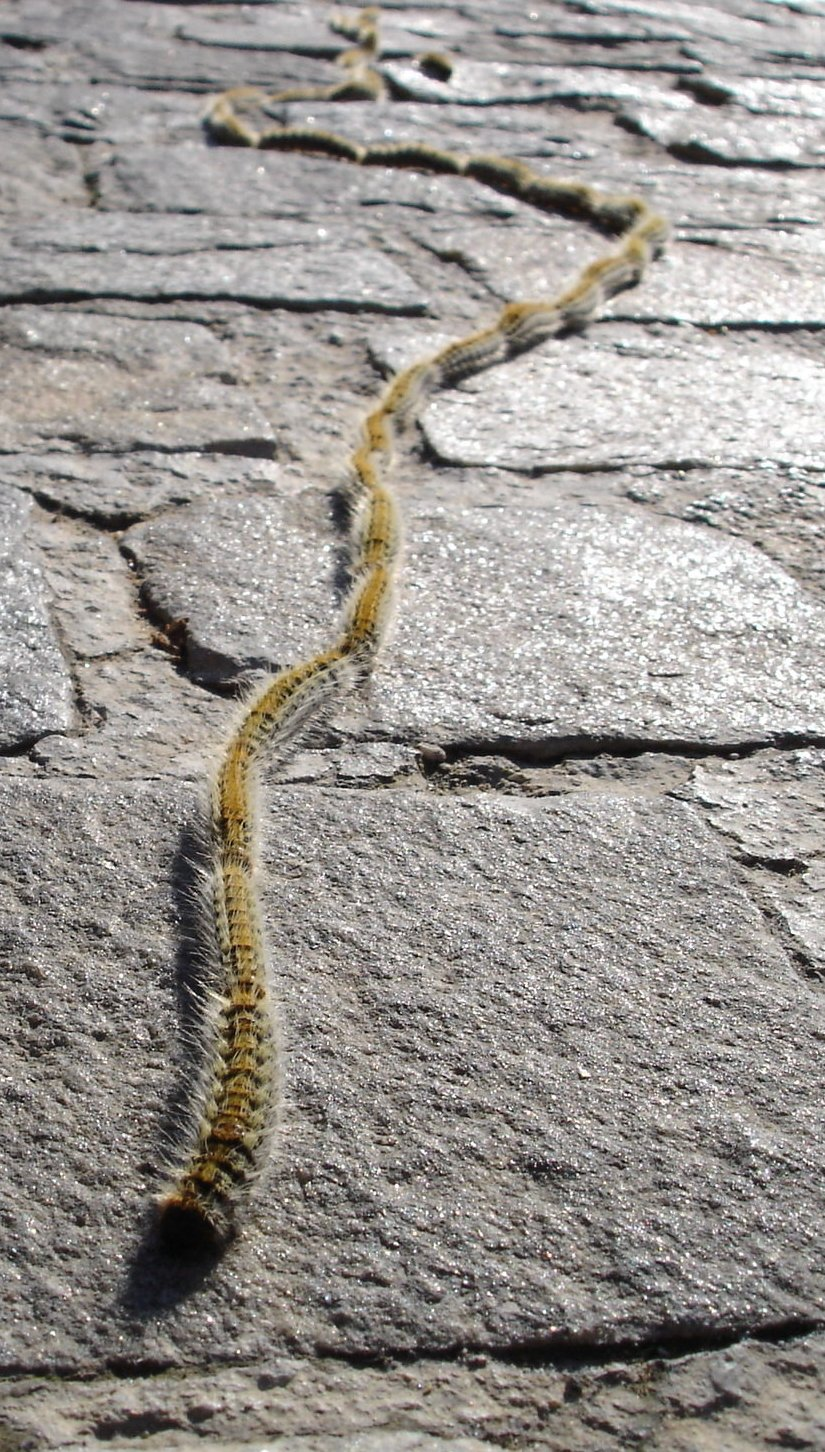
- Pine processionary larvae marching in characteristic fashion

Scientific classification
- Kingdom: Animalia
- Phylum: Arthropoda
- Class: Insecta
- Order: Lepidoptera
- Superfamily: Noctuoidea
- Family: Notodontidae
- Genus: Thaumetopoea
- Species: T. pityocampa

Binomial name
- Thaumetopoea pityocampa (Denis & Schiffermüller, 1775)

= Pine processionary =

Species of moth

The pine processionary (Thaumetopoea pityocampa) is a moth of the subfamily Thaumetopoeinae in the family Notodontidae, known for the irritating hairs of its caterpillars, their processions, and the economic damage they cause in coniferous forests. The species was first described scientifically by Michael Denis and Ignaz Schiffermüller in 1775, though it was known to the ancients, with remedies described by Theophrastus, Dioscorides and Pliny the Elder. Its processionary behaviour was described in 1916 by the French entomologist Jean-Henri Fabre. It is one of the most destructive species to pines and cedars in Central Asia, North Africa and southern Europe.

The species is notable for the behaviour of its caterpillars, which overwinter in tent-like nests high in pine trees, and which proceed through the woods in nose-to-tail columns, protected from predators by their severely irritating hairs.

The species is one of the few insects where the larva develops in winter in temperate zones. Global warming is causing the species to affect forests progressively further north. The urticating hairs of the caterpillar larvae cause harmful (and in some cases allergic) reactions, in humans and other mammals.

== History of study ==
The Greek physician Dioscorides noted in the 1st century AD the urtication caused by the pine-dwelling pityokampē caterpillar, the name meaning "Aleppo pine larva" (Ancient Greek: πιτυοκάμπη; from πίτυς pitys "pine" and κάμπη kampē "caterpillar"), in his 77 AD book De materia medica, Pliny the Elder recorded a treatment for the resulting itching in his Natural History; Theophrastus had earlier recommended the medicinal plant elecampane (horse-heal) in oil and wine to treat contact with "pine larvae" in his Historia Plantarum.

The French entomologist Jean-Henri Fabre conducted a famous study on the pine processionary caterpillar where a group of them followed head-to-tail in a circle around the rim of a flower pot; they continued marching in the circle for a week. He described the experiment in his 1916 book The Life of the Caterpillar. The study has been cited innumerable times by inspirational and religious speakers who view it as a metaphor for blindly following a leader or for confusing activity with accomplishment. Fabre considered his caterpillars to be mindless automatons, trapped because they were pre-programmed to blindly follow trails, in this case the endless one that they had laid down around the circular pot rim. Fabre's caterpillars may have been physically trapped on the narrow rim of the pot, but circular trails established by young caterpillars do continue to circle for as long as 12 hours even when free on a flat surface.

== Description ==
The adult is a stout furry moth which holds its wings like a tent over the body, in the manner of the eggar moths (Lasiocampidae). The adult is larger than the oak processionary, Thaumetopoea processionea, has a crescent marking on the wings (unlike the pale eggar moth; the oak processionary has an indistinct marking), and is found in coniferous rather than broad-leaved forests. The caterpillars are readily recognised by their processionary habit and their presence (with large silken nests and signs of defoliation) in coniferous woods. They are orange-brown and hairy with blue bands.

== Distribution ==
The species is native to the southern Mediterranean area, North Africa, the Middle East, and southern Europe. It has been spreading northwards since the 1990s, assisted by climate change and by commercial activities including planting of host trees and transportation, and has reached Brittany, forests to the north of Paris, and Strasbourg in northern France.

A paler subspecies, T. pityocampa orana, occurs in North Africa from Morocco to Libya, at altitudes to 2,000 metres (6,600 ft) in the Middle Atlas; the adults fly between April and August.

== Life cycle ==
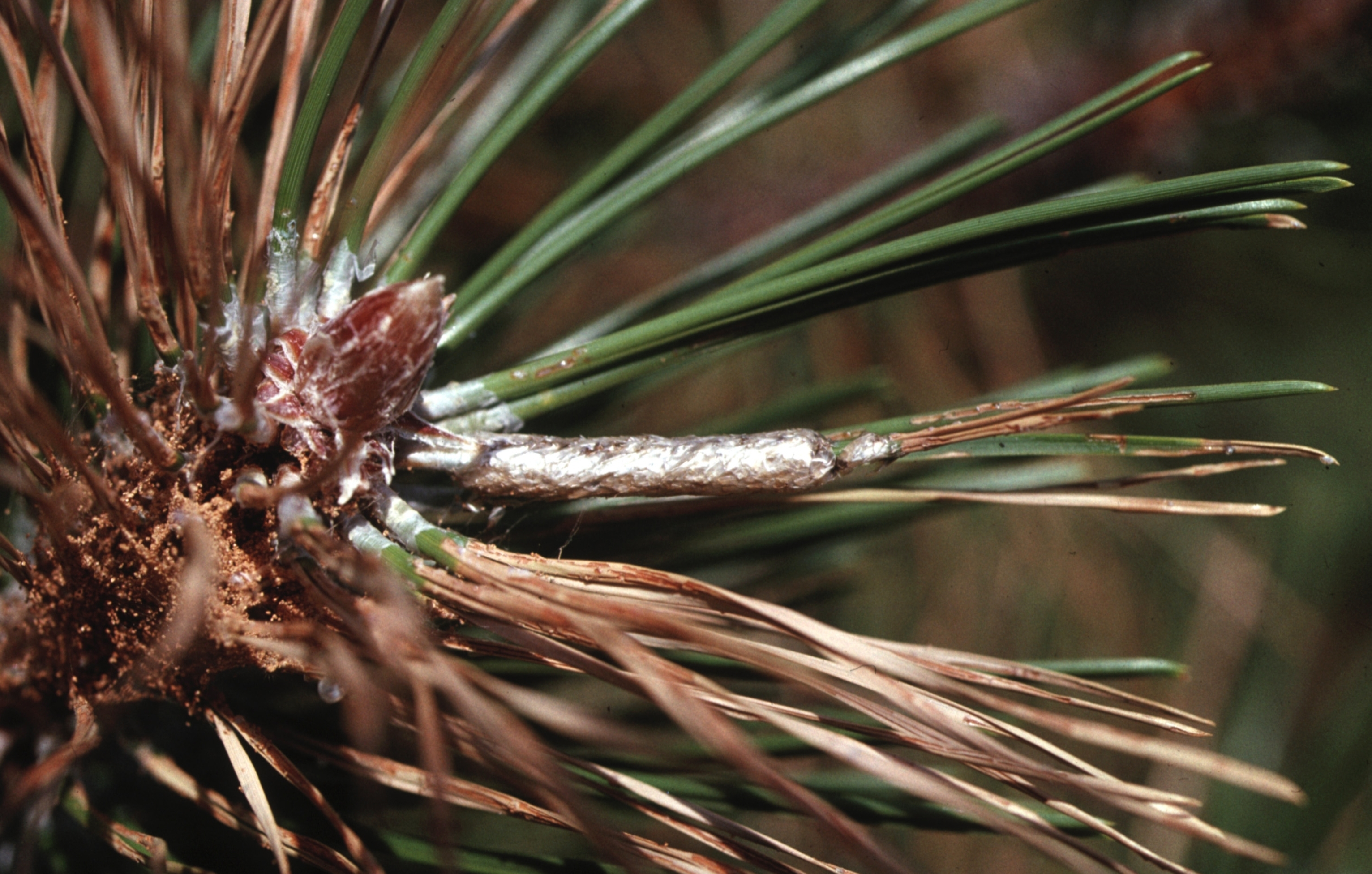
Eggs on pine

Though most individuals of the species only live one year, some in high altitudes or more northern areas may survive for over two years. Each female lays an "enormous number" of eggs near the tops of pine trees. After hatching, the larvae eat pine needles while progressing through five stages of development (instars). To survive through the winter, the caterpillars construct a nest of silk threads, making them one of the few species of temperate zone insects where the larvae develop in winter. Around the beginning of April, the caterpillars leave the nests in the procession for which the species is known. They burrow underground, pupate, and emerge between mid May and August.

The eggs are laid in cylindrical bodies ranging from 4 to 5 centimetres (1.6 to 2.0 in) in length. The eggs are covered with scales which come from the female and mimic pine shoots.

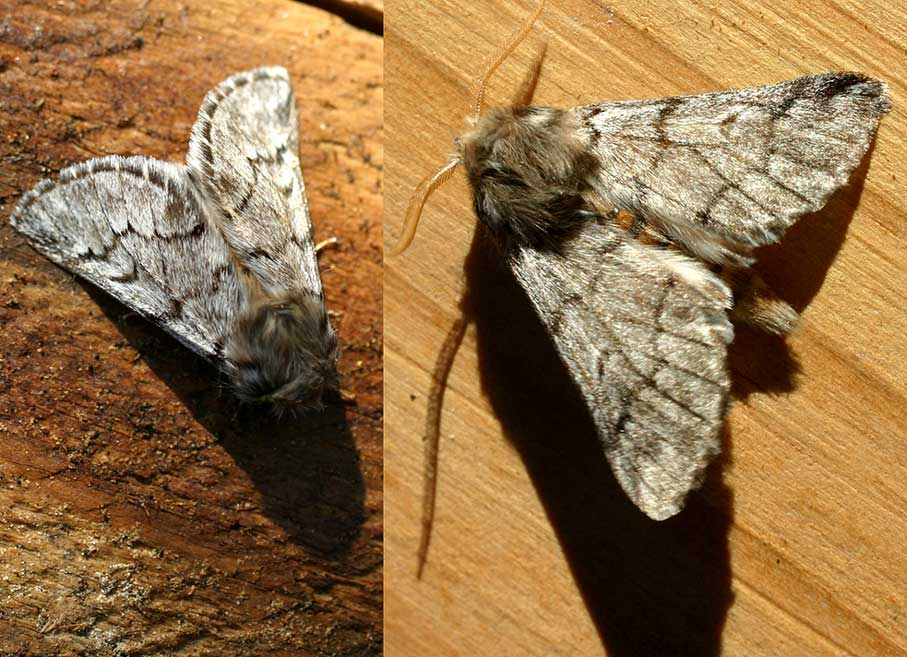
Adult

The larva is a major forest pest, living communally in large "tents", usually in pine trees but occasionally in cedar or larch, marching out at night in single file (hence the common name) to feed on the needles. There are often several such tents in a single tree. When they are ready to pupate, the larvae march in their usual fashion to the ground, where they disperse to pupate singly on or just below the surface.

The moth's pupal stage occurs in a white silken cocoon under soil. The pupae measure around 20 millimetres (0.79 in) and are a pale brownish-yellow that changes into a dark reddish brown.

As an adult, T. pityocampa has predominantly light brown forewings with brown markings. The moth's hindwings are white. Females have larger wingspans of 36 to 49 millimetres (1.4 to 1.9 in), compared to a male's 31 to 39 millimetres (1.2 to 1.5 in). Adults only live for a single day, when they mate and lay eggs. Males are able to fly several tens of kilometres, but the moth's dispersal depends on how far the female is able to fly during her short time as an adult. Her average flying distance is 1.7 kilometres (1.1 mi), with a maximum recorded of 10.5 kilometres (6.5 mi).

== Behaviour ==
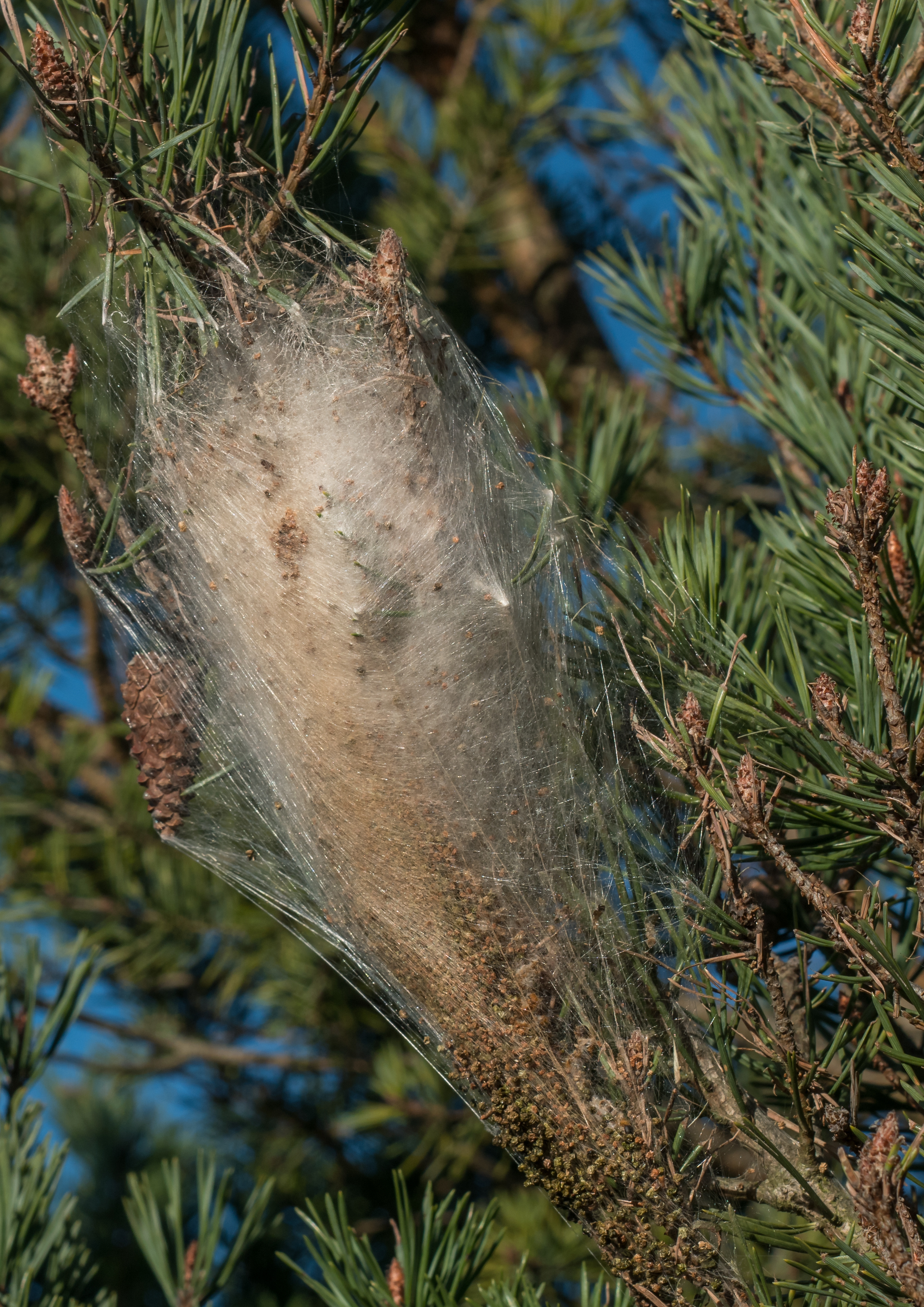
Tent made by larvae in pine tree; frass collects at the bottom of the tent.

=== Shelter building ===
T. pityocampa is highly social. Throughout its life cycle, an individual makes several shelters, possibly for protection from predators; the larvae emerge to feed at night. The first of these is flimsy and temporary, but in the third instar, they build a permanent nest. Once the permanent nest is built, the caterpillars become foragers, staying in the vicinity of the nest. The nest has no openings, so caterpillars force themselves through the layers of the shelter. The waste from the larvae's diet falls as frass and accumulates at the bottom of the nest.

=== Processions ===
Lengthy processions are formed when fully grown caterpillars abandon their host tree in search of pupation sites, when as many as three hundred caterpillars may travel long distances from the natal tree looking for soft soil in which to bury themselves and form cocoons. During processions, stimuli from setae on the tip of the abdomen of the caterpillar in front serve to hold processions together, taking priority over the trail pheromone or silk.

== Parasites, predators, and diseases ==
The species is controlled to some extent by predators, parasites and viruses which attack the moth at many stages of its life cycle. For example, eggs are eaten by the orthopteran Ephippiger ephippiger, while larvae are eaten by birds such as great tit (Parus major) and great spotted cuckoo (Clamator glandarius). Larvae are parasitised by solitary wasps (Ichneumonidae, Braconidae) and some species of flies (Tachinidae), and may be infected by the processionary moth virus Smithiavirus pityocampae. Pupae are eaten by hoopoes (Upupa epops), while adults are eaten by bats.

Mantis religiosa eating caterpillar, Pyrenees

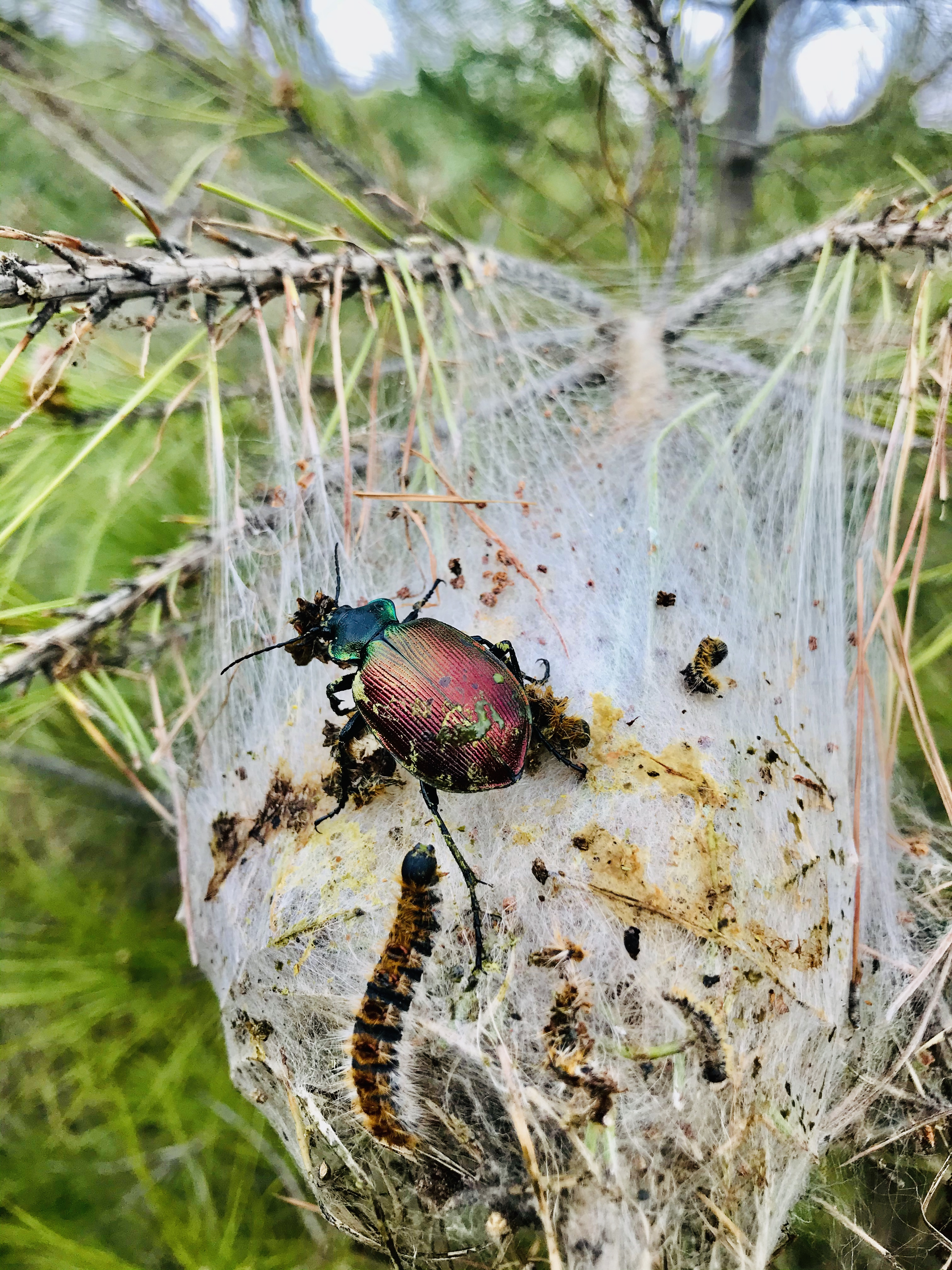
Calosoma sycophanta beetle eating caterpillar, Turkey

== Interactions with humans ==
=== Skin and eye irritation ===
In the third and subsequent instars of their development, pine processionary caterpillars defend themselves from predators with conspicuous hairs containing an irritant chemical, thaumetopoein. Simple contact with the hairs of the caterpillar can cause severe rashes (urticaria) and eye irritation in humans and other mammals, and some individuals may have an allergic reaction. When stressed or threatened, fifth-stage larvae eject hairs shaped like harpoons, which penetrate all areas of exposed skin nearby and irritate them with an urticating protein.

=== Forestry damage ===
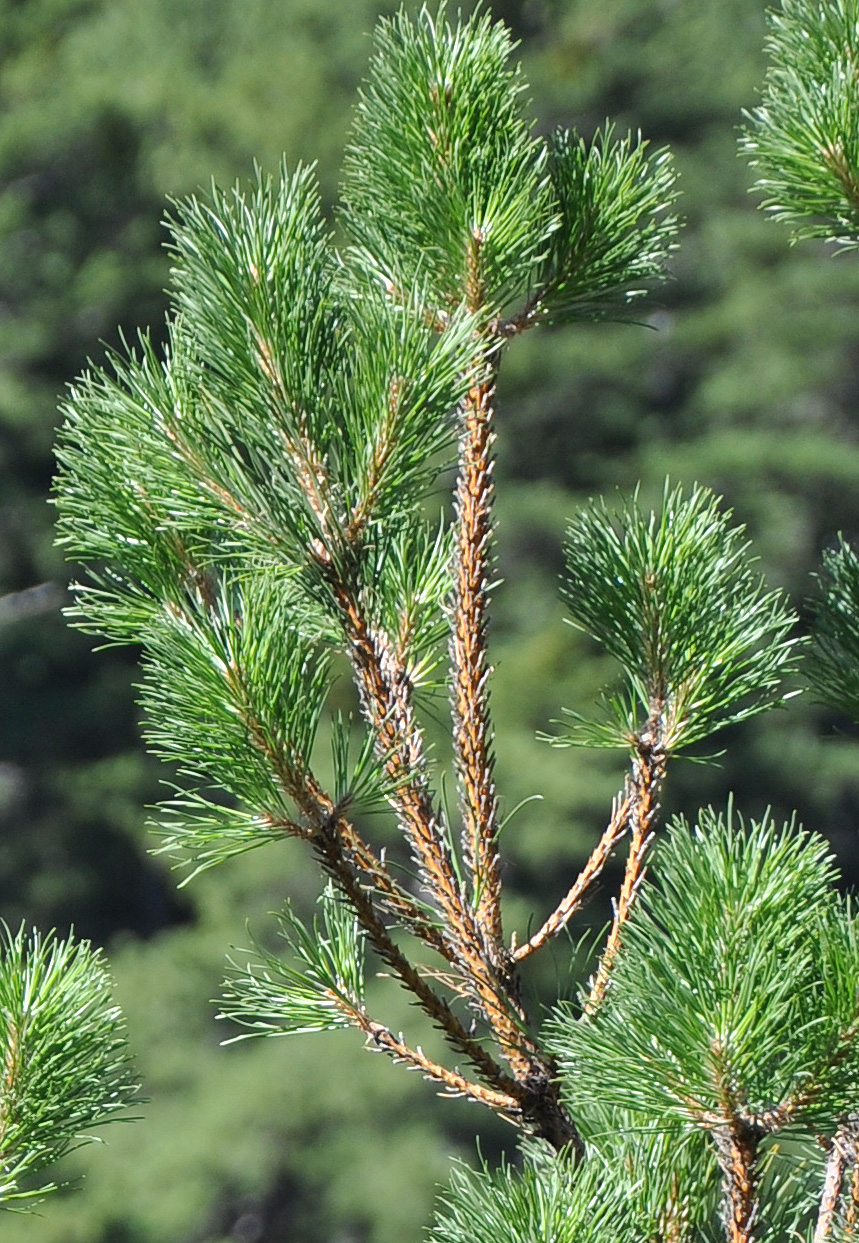
Damage to conifer, showing bitten-off needles

The pine processionary is a major economic pest in coniferous forests in southern Europe, where the caterpillar is responsible for most of the defoliation seen in coniferous trees; outbreaks are somewhat cyclical, with a period of 7 to 9 years. Although pines are the most susceptible, other conifer trees such as larches are also vulnerable. The caterpillars can completely defoliate trees if large numbers are present.

Global warming is causing the species to affect forests progressively further north. It has for example been a pest of forests in Southern Europe since classical times, but it has already reached the north of France.

=== Artificial control ===
Efforts to control the pine processionary have included biological control using Bacillus thuringiensis, which is effective on eggs and first- or second-stage caterpillars (in September or October), or insecticides such as diflubenzuron, an insect growth regulator, which can be sprayed from aircraft. Monitoring can include the use of pheromone traps. Other methods that have been tried include insecticides in oil inserted directly into nests, and mechanical removal of nests.

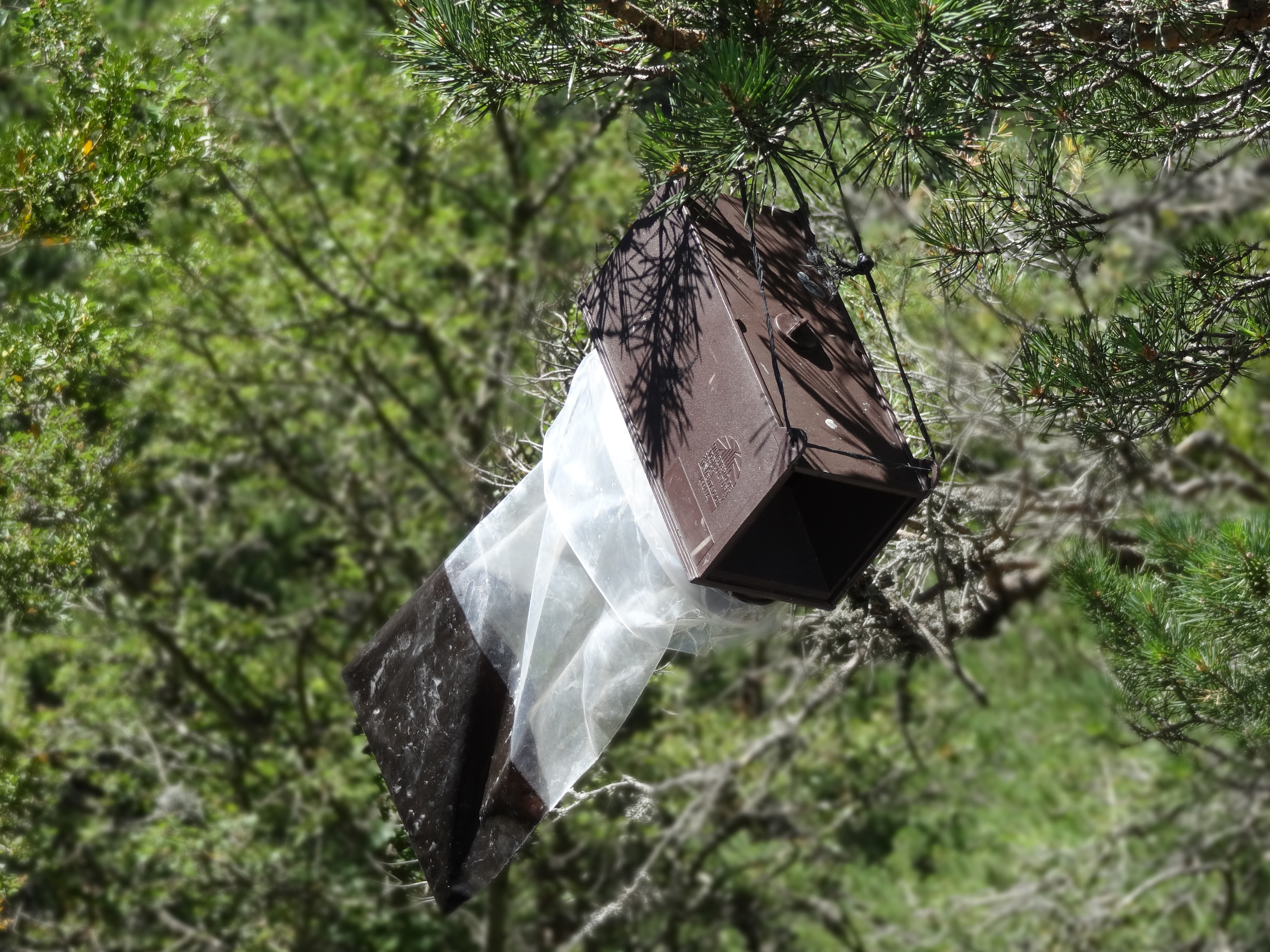
Synthetic pheromone trap, Spain, 2012

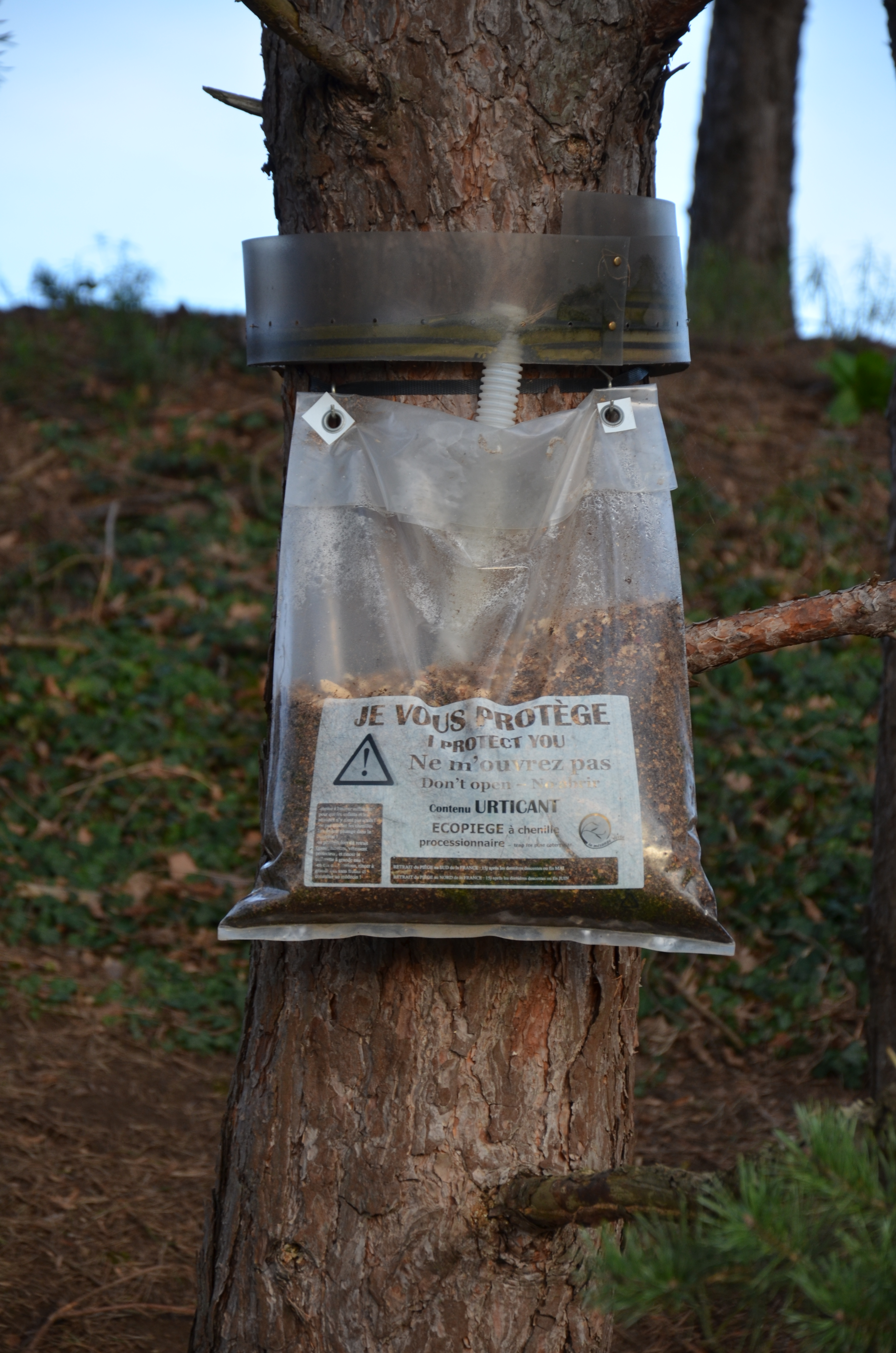
"Ecological trap" for processionary caterpillars, France, 2014

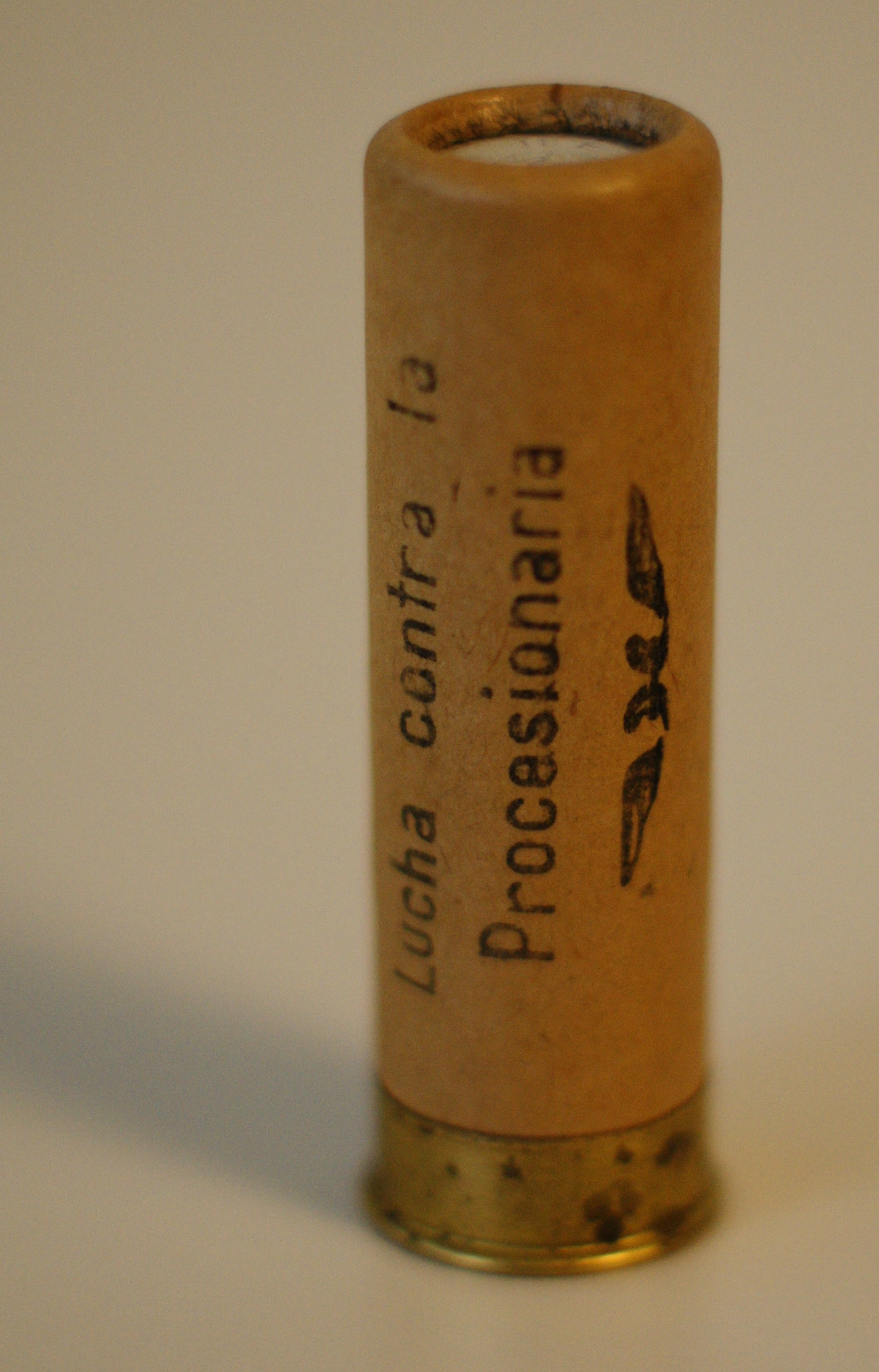
Cartridge (Note: The cartridge is printed Lucha contra la Procesionaria, "Fight against the processionary moth".) of the Spanish forest pest service, to be fired into pine processionary nests, 2016

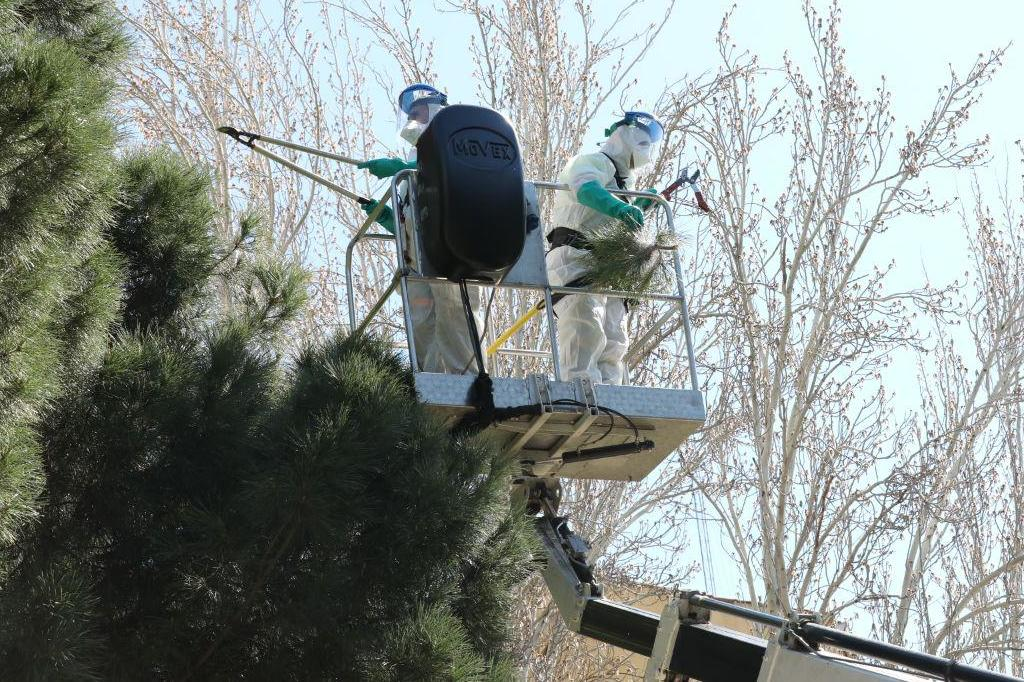
Madrid City Council workers in protective clothing cutting pine processionary nests, 2019

== See also ==
- Oak processionary
