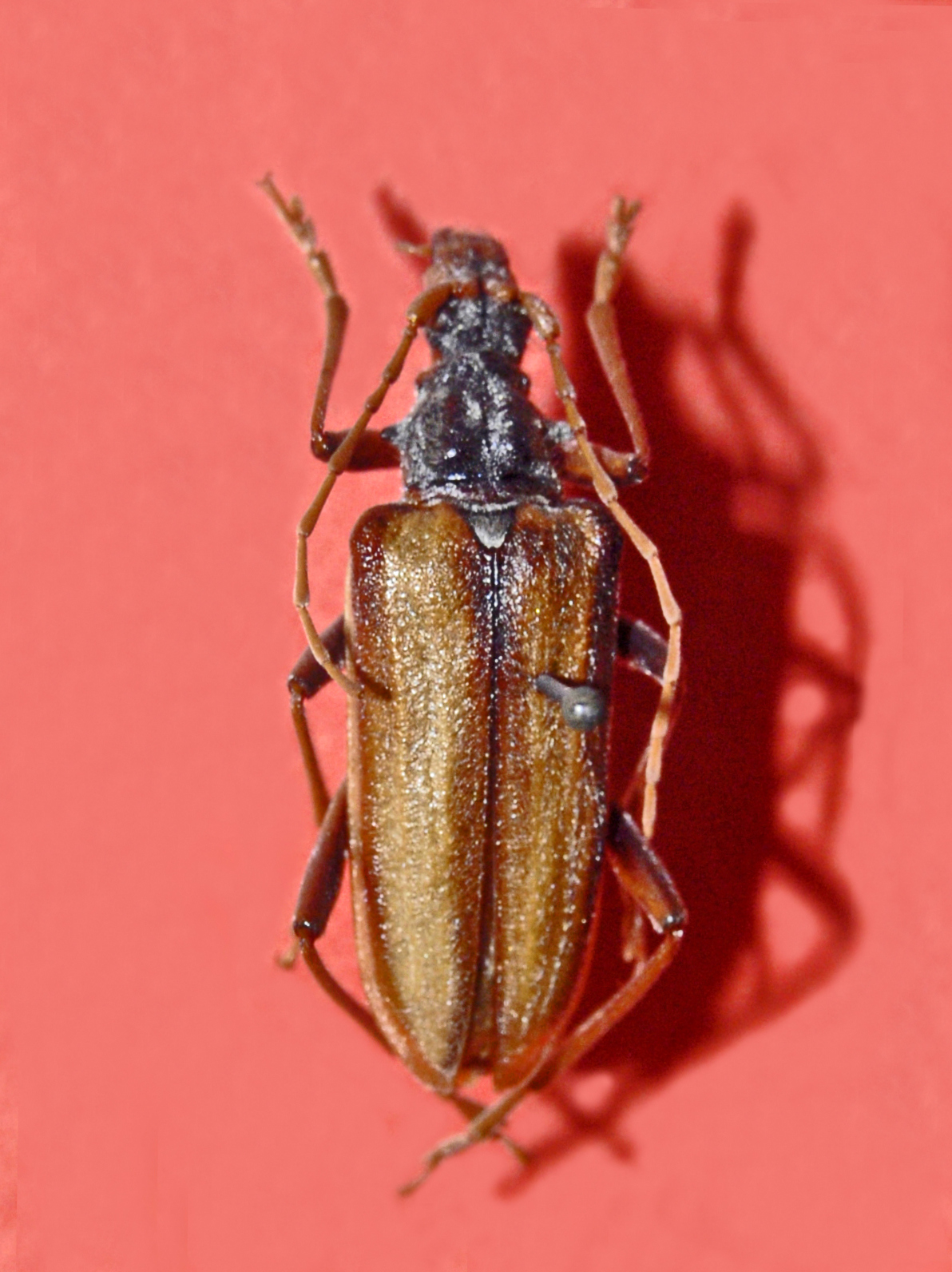
- Female of Oxymirus cursor. Mounted specimen

Scientific classification
- Kingdom: Animalia
- Phylum: Arthropoda
- Class: Insecta
- Order: Coleoptera
- Suborder: Polyphaga
- Infraorder: Cucujiformia
- Family: Cerambycidae
- Subfamily: Lepturinae
- Genus: Oxymirus; Mulsant, 1863

= Oxymirus =

Genus of beetles

Oxymirus is the genus of the Lepturinae subfamily in long-horned beetle family.

== Species ==
- Oxymirus cursor (Linnaeus, 1758)
- Oxymirus mirabilis (Motschulsky, 1838)

== Description ==
Species within this genus can reach a length of 14–20 millimetres (0.55–0.79 in). Body is generally black, while elytra are mainly brown. Prothorax has large spikes. Antennae are long and in the males they extend beyond the top of the elytra.

== Distribution ==
Species of the genus Oxymirus are present in most of Europe and in the eastern Palearctic realm.
