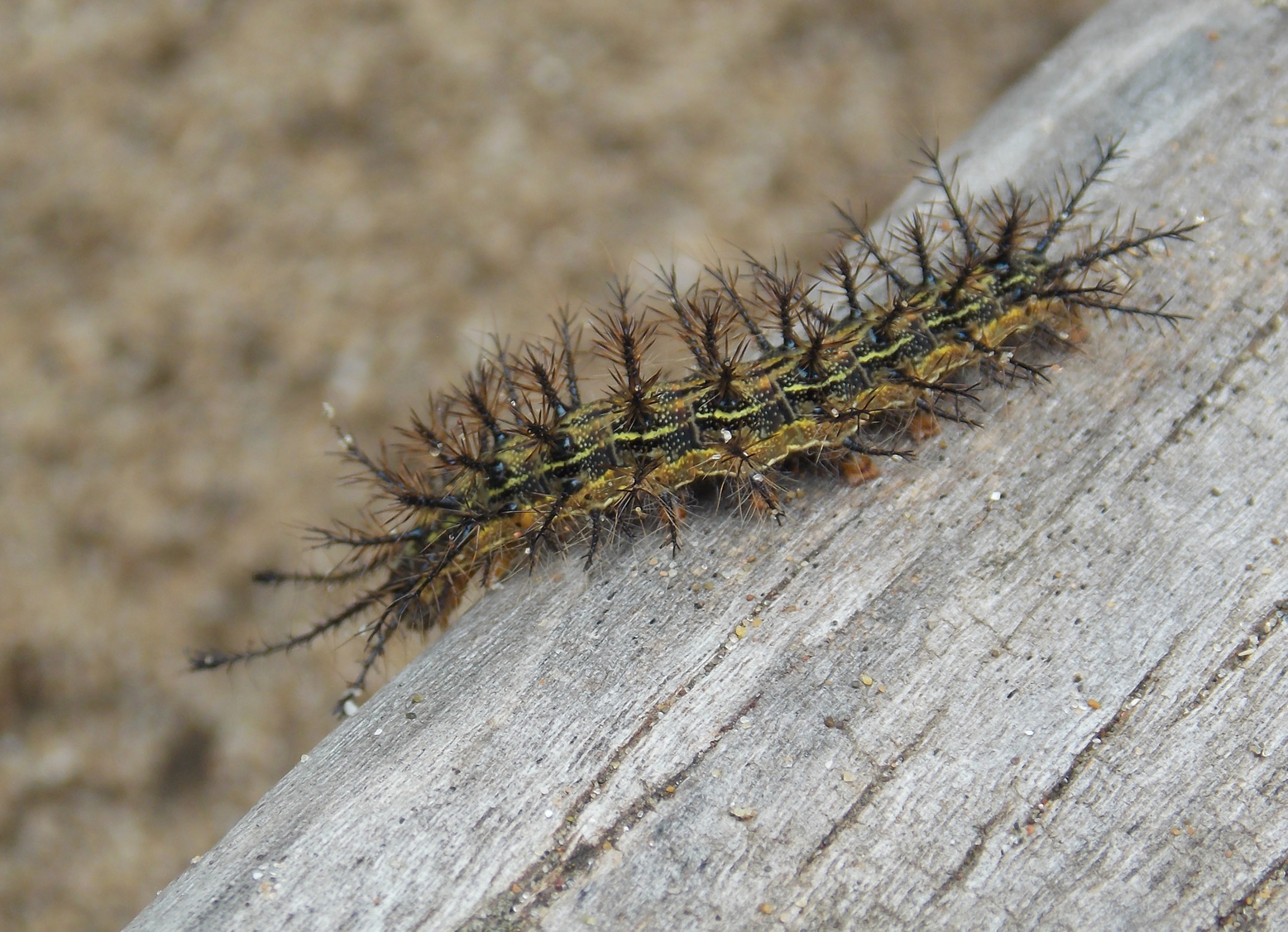

Scientific classification
- Kingdom: Animalia
- Phylum: Arthropoda
- Clade: Pancrustacea
- Class: Insecta
- Order: Lepidoptera
- Family: Saturniidae
- Genus: Hylesia
- Species: H. nigricans

Binomial name
- Hylesia nigricans Berg, 1875

= Hylesia nigricans =

Species of moth

Hylesia nigricans is a species of Lepidoptera of the family Saturniidae. It is a nocturnal moth endemic to Argentina and Brazil. It can be found mainly in the north and center of Argentina, the south of Bolivia and the south of Brazil, due to climatic factors which favor its reproduction. The species was first described by Carlos Berg in 1875.

The female adult can reach an average wingspan of 45 mm. Its larvae have an average length of 40 to 45 mm, with black and yellow bodies covered by urticating hairs which, upon contact with skin, produce irritation, causing an extended dermatitis. The larvae are known in Spanish as gata peluda (hairy cat) or bicho quemador (burning bug). The adult is a dark-colored moth - which is where its name comes from - with the back of its abdomen covered by smooth golden hairs.

It possesses a voracious appetite, attacking fruit bearing, ornamental and forest plants. It was declared a national plague in Argentina in 1911. There exists a range of chemical products aimed at controlling their development.

== Life cycle ==
The eggs are laid in overlapping layers of up to 900, protected by a yellow cocoon built by the female using her secretions and abdominal hairs. During the spring (October to December), 200 to 740 of these eggs hatch.

Once the larvae are born, they slither in large groups along tree trunks, branches and leaves, usually causing vast defoliation.

Before pupation, the larva gathers leaves and adheres them together with its bodily secretions to form a cocoon, situated either on a plant or among the leaves on the ground. It remains immobile in its pupal state during the winter.
