= Hylesia coinopus =

Scientific classification
- Kingdom: Animalia
- Phylum: Arthropoda
- Class: Insecta
- Order: Lepidoptera
- Family: Saturniidae
- Genus: Hylesia
- Species: H. coinopus

Binomial name
- Hylesia coinopus Dyar, 1913

Species of moth

Hylesia coinopus is a species of insect in the moth family Saturniidae. It is found in Central America and North America.

The MONA or Hodges number for Hylesia coinopus is 7750.
