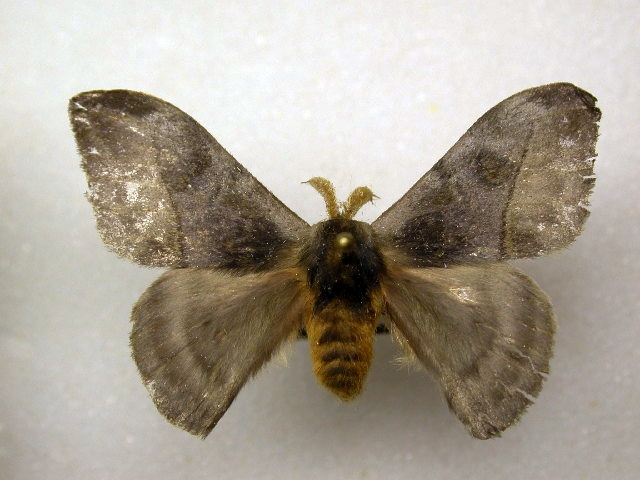

Scientific classification
- Domain: Eukaryota
- Kingdom: Animalia
- Phylum: Arthropoda
- Class: Insecta
- Order: Lepidoptera
- Family: Saturniidae
- Genus: Hylesia
- Species: H. annulata

Binomial name
- Hylesia annulata Schaus, 1911

= Hylesia annulata =

Species of moth

Hylesia annulata is a moth of the family Saturniidae. It is found in French Guiana, Costa Rica and Ecuador.
