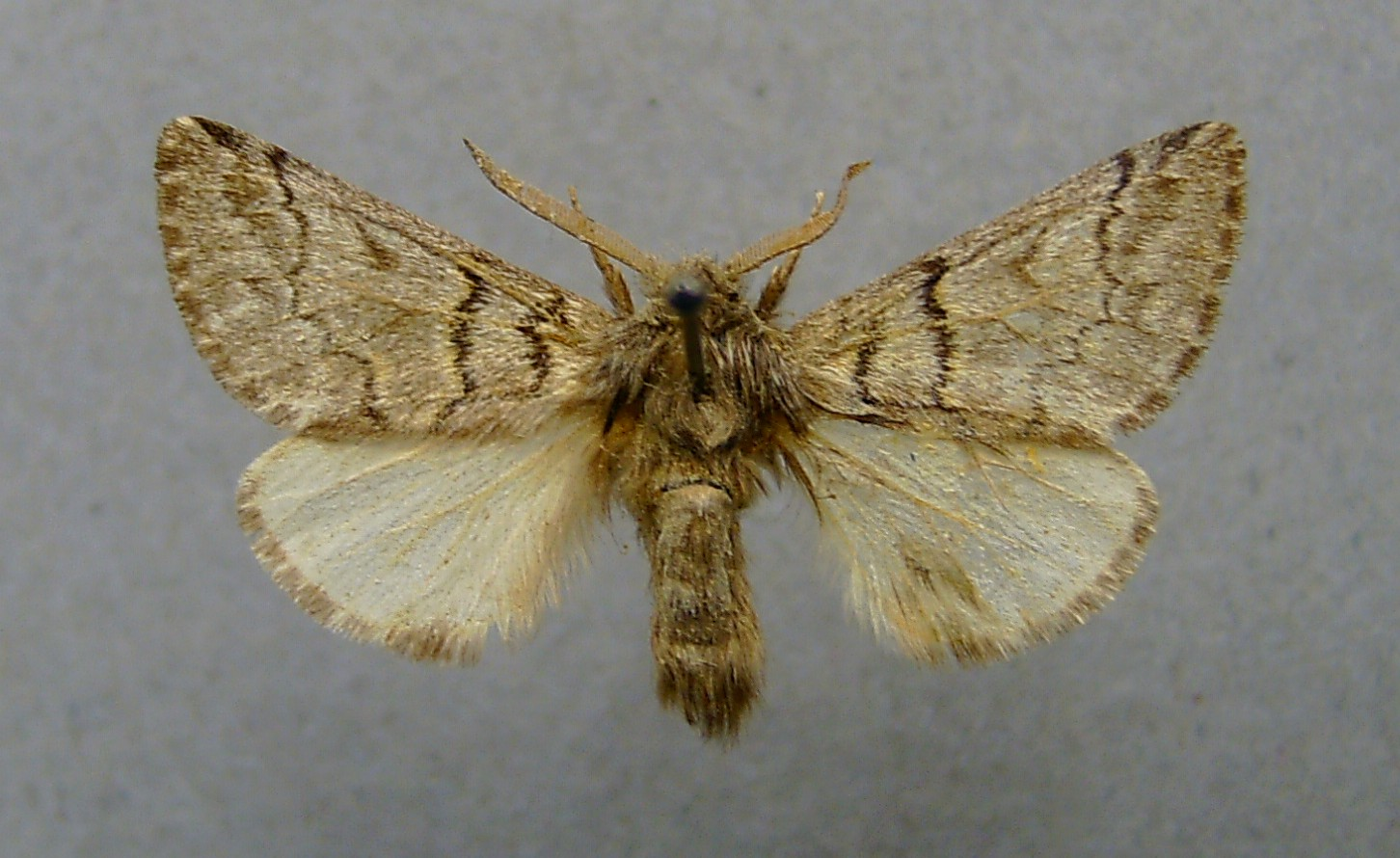

Scientific classification
- Domain: Eukaryota
- Kingdom: Animalia
- Phylum: Arthropoda
- Class: Insecta
- Order: Lepidoptera
- Superfamily: Noctuoidea
- Family: Notodontidae
- Genus: Thaumetopoea
- Species: T. pinivora

Binomial name
- Thaumetopoea pinivora (Treitschke, 1834)

= Thaumetopoea pinivora =

Species of moth

Thaumetopoea pinivora, the eastern pine processionary, is a moth of the family Notodontidae. The species was first described by Georg Friedrich Treitschke in 1834. It is found in southeast and central Europe and Asia Minor.

The wingspan is 15–18 mm. The moths are on wing from May to September.

The larvae feed on Pinus species.

== Sources ==
- P.C.-Rougeot, P. Viette (1978). Guide des papillons nocturnes d'Europe et d'Afrique du Nord. Delachaux et Niestlé (Lausanne).
