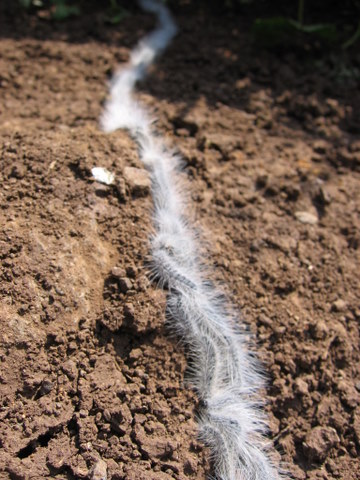

Scientific classification
- Domain: Eukaryota
- Kingdom: Animalia
- Phylum: Arthropoda
- Class: Insecta
- Order: Lepidoptera
- Superfamily: Noctuoidea
- Family: Notodontidae
- Genus: Thaumetopoea
- Species: T. solitaria

Binomial name
- Thaumetopoea solitaria (Freyer, 1838)

= Thaumetopoea solitaria =

Species of moth

Thaumetopoea solitaria is a moth of the subfamily Thaumetopoeinae in the family Notodontidae first described by Christian Friedrich Freyer in 1838.

== Distribution ==
It is found in Anatolia (including Turkey), on Cyprus, east to Syria, Israel, Lebanon, Iraq and Iran.

== Description ==
The wingspan is 20–28 mm for males and 25–35 mm for females. The moths are on wing from August to September.

The larvae feed on various species of Pistacia, among which: Pistacia terebinthus, Pistacia atlantica, and Pistacia palaestina.

== Sources ==
- P.C.-Rougeot, P. Viette (1978). Guide des papillons nocturnes d'Europe et d'Afrique du Nord. Delachaux et Niestlé (Lausanne).
