= Lepidopterism =

- Specialty: Dermatology

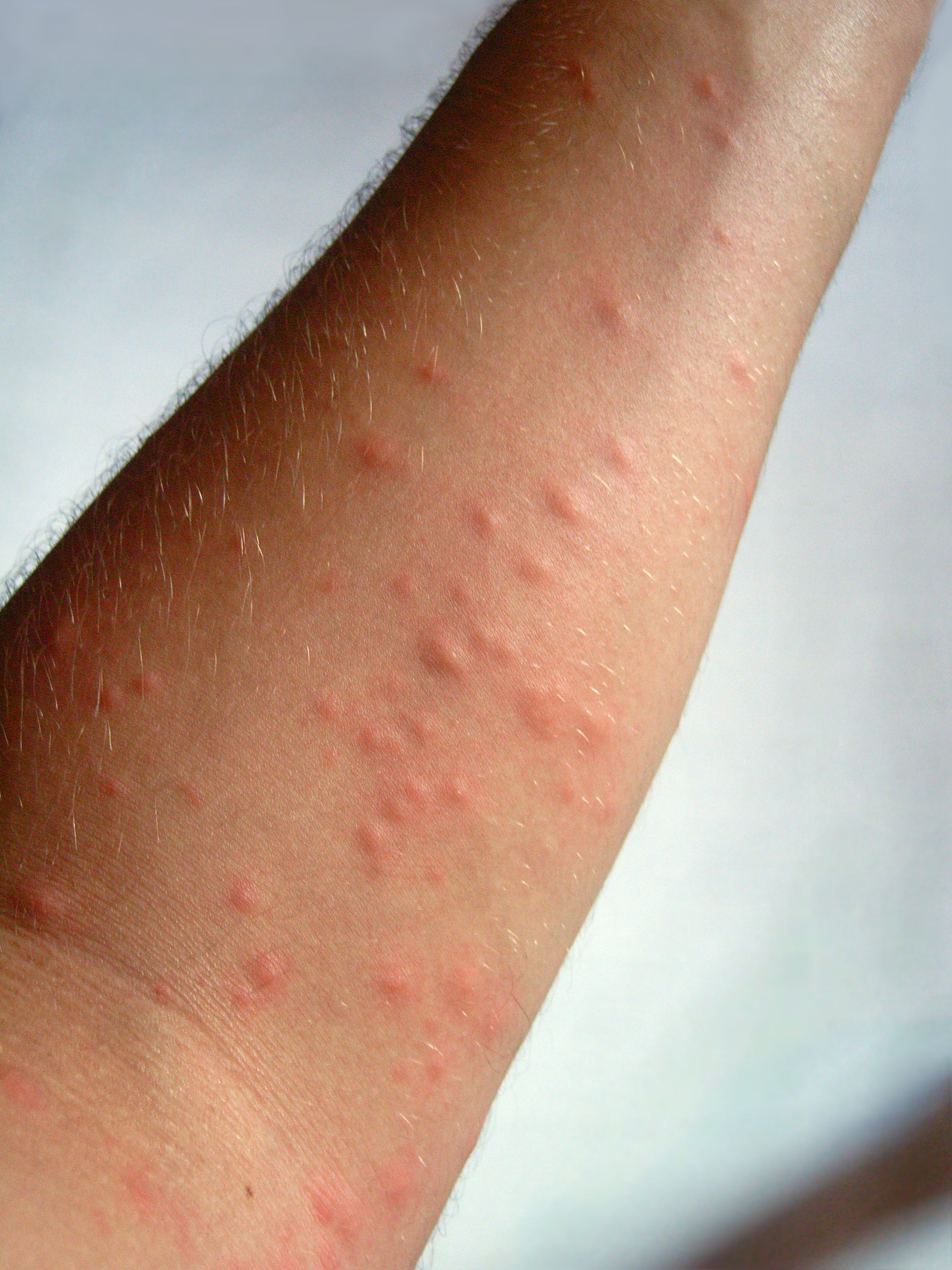
Caterpillar dermatitis (lepidopterism) caused by Oak Processionary (Thaumetopoea processionea)

Lepidopterism is an irritant contact dermatitis caused by irritating caterpillar or moth hairs coming into contact with the skin or mucosa. When referring to the cause, moth dermatitis and caterpillar dermatitis are commonly used; Caripito itch (known as papillonite in French) is an older name referring to the moth dermatitis caused by some Hylesia species.

== See also ==
- Lonomia
- Oak processionary which may cause airborne problems
- Millipede burn
- List of cutaneous conditions
