= Thaumetopoea bonjeani =

Scientific classification
- Domain: Eukaryota
- Kingdom: Animalia
- Phylum: Arthropoda
- Class: Insecta
- Order: Lepidoptera
- Superfamily: Noctuoidea
- Family: Notodontidae
- Genus: Thaumetopoea
- Species: T. bonjeani

Binomial name
- Thaumetopoea bonjeani Powell, 1922

Species of moth

Thaumetopoea bonjeani, the cedar processionary, is a moth in the family Notodontidae. It was first described by Harold Powell in 1922 and it is found in Morocco.

The wingspan is 15–16 mm. The moths are on wing from July to October.

The larvae feed on cedar species.

== Sources ==
- P.C.-Rougeot, P. Viette (1978). Guide des papillons nocturnes d'Europe et d'Afrique du Nord. Delachaux et Niestlé (Lausanne).
