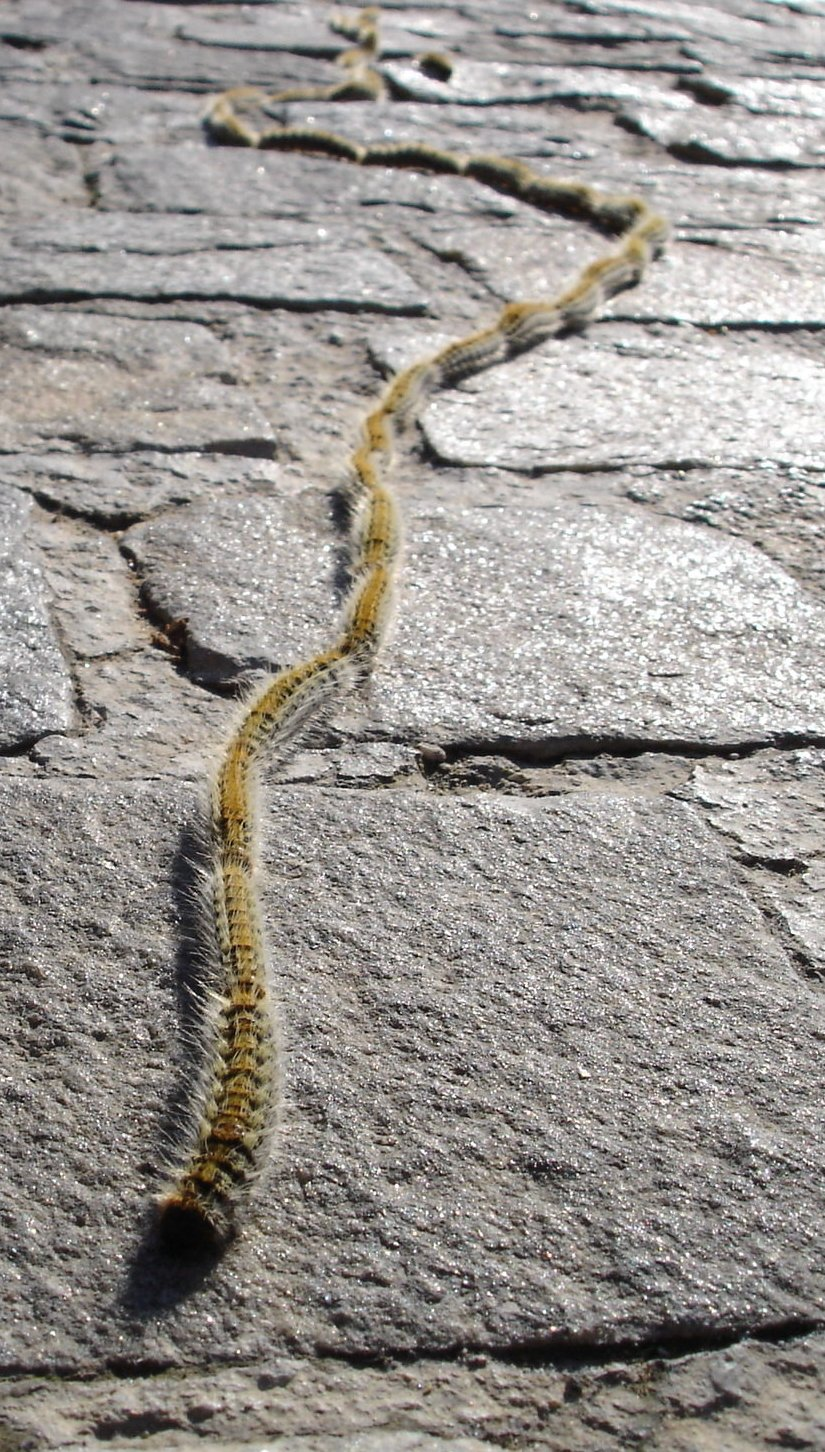
- A Thaumetopoea species, pine processionary caterpillars

Scientific classification
- Kingdom: Animalia
- Phylum: Arthropoda
- Clade: Pancrustacea
- Class: Insecta
- Order: Lepidoptera
- Superfamily: Noctuoidea
- Family: Notodontidae
- Subfamily: Thaumetopoeinae
- Genus: Thaumetopoea; Hübner, 1820

Type species
- Phalaena processionea Linnaeus, 1758

Synonyms
- Cnethocampa Stephens, 1828; Traumatocampa Wallengren, 1871; Helianthocampa de Freina & Witt, 1985

= Thaumetopoea =

Genus of moths

Thaumetopoea is a genus of moths belonging to the family Notodontidae. It was first described by Jacob Hübner in 1820.

In their caterpillar form, they bear the vernacular name of processionary because their gregarious larvae conspicuously move in single file. The adults live a few days without feeding.

Some Thaumetopoea species, for example Thaumetopoea pityocampa, are expanding their range towards higher latitudes and altitudes due to the current climate warming. The caterpillars carry urticating hairs which cause health problems in humans.

== Systematics ==
The etymology of the name of the genus is from the Greek words θαυματόεις (thaumatóeis), "marvellous", and ποιεῖν (poieîn), "to create", thus meaning "creating wonder", i.e. "looking remarkable". This explains why the name is sometimes spelled Thaumatopoea, i.e. in the Latinized form of θαυματοποιία thaumatopoiia "marvellous achievement" (cf. θαῦμα thauma "marvel, wonder").

The genus Thaumetopoea contains the following species:

- Thaumetopoea bonjeani (Powell, 1922) - cedar processionary
- Thaumetopoea herculeana Rambur, 1840
- Thaumetopoea pinivora (Treitschke, 1834) or Traumatocampa pinivora (Treitschke 1834) - eastern pine processionary
- Thaumetopoea pityocampa (Denis and Schiffermüller, 1775) or Traumatocampa pityocampa (Denis & Schiffermüller 1775) - pine processionary
- Thaumetopoea processionea (Linnaeus, 1758) - oak processionary
- Thaumetopoea solitaria (Freyer, 1838) - pistachio processionary or solitary
- Thaumetopoea wilkinsoni Tams, 1924 or Traumatocampa wilkinsoni (Tams 1926)
- Thaumetopoea hellenica
- Thaumetopoea mediterranea

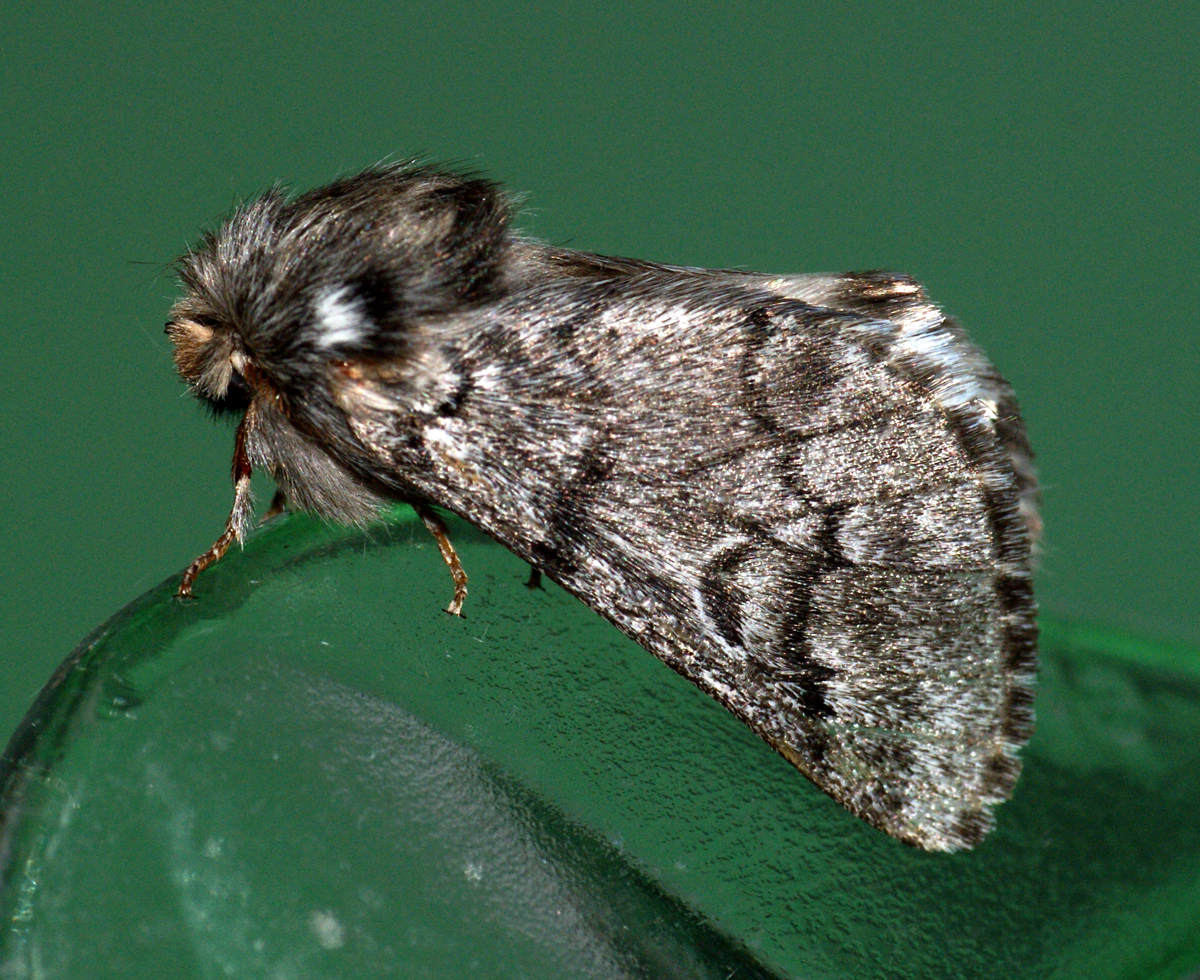
Thaumetopoea pityocampa, imago
