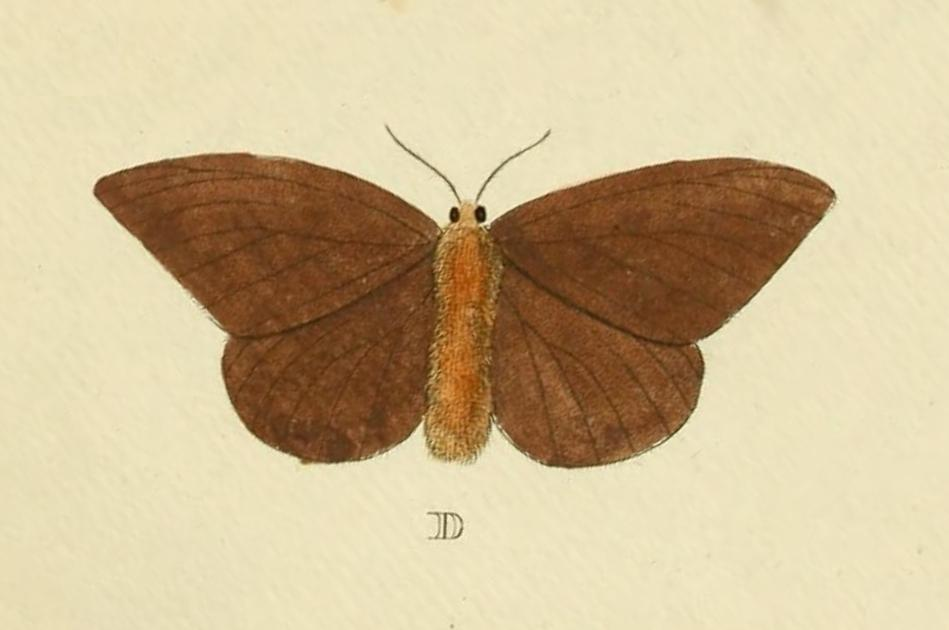
- Hylesia metabus

Scientific classification
- Domain: Eukaryota
- Kingdom: Animalia
- Phylum: Arthropoda
- Class: Insecta
- Order: Lepidoptera
- Family: Saturniidae
- Subfamily: Hemileucinae
- Genus: Hylesia; Hübner, [1820]

Species
- See text

Synonyms
- Micrattacus Walker, 1855

= Hylesia =

Genus of moths

Hylesia is a genus of moths in the family Saturniidae. The genus was erected by Jacob Hübner in 1820.

== Species ==
- Hylesia acuta Druce, 1886
- Hylesia aeneides (Druce, 1897)
- Hylesia alticola Lemaire, 1988
- Hylesia anchises Lemaire, 1988
- Hylesia andensis Lemaire, 1988
- Hylesia andrei Dognin, 1923
- Hylesia angulex Draudt, 1929
- Hylesia annulata Schaus, 1911
- Hylesia ascodex Dyar, 1913
- Hylesia athlia Dyar, 1913
- Hylesia beneluzi Lemaire, 1988
- Hylesia bertrandi Lemaire, 1982
- Hylesia biolleya Schaus, 1927
- Hylesia bouvereti Dognin, 1889
- Hylesia canitia (Cramer, 1780)
- Hylesia cedomnibus Dyar, 1913
- Hylesia coex Dyar, 1913
- Hylesia coinopus Dyar, 1913
- Hylesia colimatifex Dyar, 1913
- Hylesia colombex Dognin, 1923
- Hylesia composita Dognin, 1912
- Hylesia continua (Walker, 1865)
- Hylesia corevia Schaus, 1900
- Hylesia cottica Schaus, 1932
- Hylesia cressida Dyar, 1913
- Hylesia dalina Schaus, 1911
- Hylesia daryae Decaens, Bonilla & Wolfe, 2003
- Hylesia discifex Draudt, 1929
- Hylesia dyarex Schaus, 1921
- Hylesia ebalus (Cramer, 1775)
- Hylesia egrex Draudt, 1929
- Hylesia extremex Naumann, Brosch & Wenczel, 2005
- Hylesia falcifera (Hübner, 1825)
- Hylesia fallaciosa Lemaire, 2002
- Hylesia frederici Lemaire, 1993
- Hylesia frigida Schaus, 1911
- Hylesia gamelioides Michener, 1952
- Hylesia gigantex Draudt, 1929
- Hylesia gyrex C. Brown, 1913
- Hylesia hamata Schaus, 1911
- Hylesia hawksi Lemaire, Wolfe & Monzon, 2001
- Hylesia haxairei Lemaire, 1988
- Hylesia hubbelli Lemaire, 1982
- Hylesia humilis Dognin, 1923
- Hylesia ileana Schaus, 1932
- Hylesia index Dyar, 1913
- Hylesia indurata Dyar, 1910
- Hylesia inficita (Walker, 1865)
- Hylesia invidiosa Dyar, 1914
- Hylesia iola C. Brown, 1913
- Hylesia leilex Dyar, 1913
- Hylesia lineata Druce, 1886
- Hylesia maurex Draudt, 1929
- Hylesia medifex Dognin, 1916
- Hylesia melanops Lemaire, 2002
- Hylesia melanostigma (Herrich-Schaeffer, 1855)
- Hylesia metabus (Cramer, 1775)
- Hylesia metapyrrha (Walker, 1855)
- Hylesia moronensis Lemaire, 1976
- Hylesia mortifex Dyar, 1913
- Hylesia munonia Schaus, 1927
- Hylesia murex Dyar, 1913
- Hylesia mymex Dyar, 1913
- Hylesia nanus (Walker, 1855)
- Hylesia natex Draudt, 1929
- Hylesia nigricans Berg, 1875
- Hylesia nigridorsata Dognin, 1912
- Hylesia nigripes Draudt, 1929
- Hylesia oblonga Lemaire, 2002
- Hylesia obtusa Dognin, 1923
- Hylesia olivenca Schaus, 1927
- Hylesia oratex Dyar, 1913
- Hylesia orbifex Dyar, 1913
- Hylesia oroyex Dognin, 1922
- Hylesia pallidex Dognin, 1923
- Hylesia paraguayensis Lemaire, 2002
- Hylesia paulex Dognin, 1922
- Hylesia pauper Dyar, 1913
- Hylesia pearsoni Lemaire, 2002
- Hylesia peigleri Lemaire, 2002
- Hylesia penai Lemaire, 1988
- Hylesia praeda Dognin, 1901
- Hylesia pseudomoronensis de Camargo, 2007
- Hylesia remex Dyar, 1913
- Hylesia rex Dyar, 1913
- Hylesia rosacea Schaus, 1911
- Hylesia roseata Dognin, 1914
- Hylesia rubrifrons Schaus, 1911
- Hylesia rufex Draudt, 1929
- Hylesia rufipes Schaus, 1911
- Hylesia santaelenensis Lemaire, 1988
- Hylesia schuessleri Strand, 1934
- Hylesia scortina Draudt, 1929
- Hylesia subaurea Schaus, 1900
- Hylesia subcana (Walker, 1855)
- Hylesia subcottica Lemaire, 2002
- Hylesia subfasciata Dognin, 1916
- Hylesia tapabex Dyar, 1913
- Hylesia tapareba Dyar, 1913
- Hylesia teratex Draudt, 1929
- Hylesia terranea Schaus, 1906
- Hylesia terrosex Dognin, 1916
- Hylesia thaumex Draudt, 1929
- Hylesia tinturex Schaus, 1921
- Hylesia tiphys Dognin, 1916
- Hylesia travassosi Lemaire, 1988
- Hylesia umbrata Schaus, 1911
- Hylesia umbratula Dyar, 1915
- Hylesia valvex Dyar, 1913
- Hylesia vassali Lemaire, 1988
- Hylesia venezuelensis Lemaire, 2002
- Hylesia vialactea Draudt, 1929
- Hylesia vindex Dyar, 1913
- Hylesia zonex Draudt, 1929
