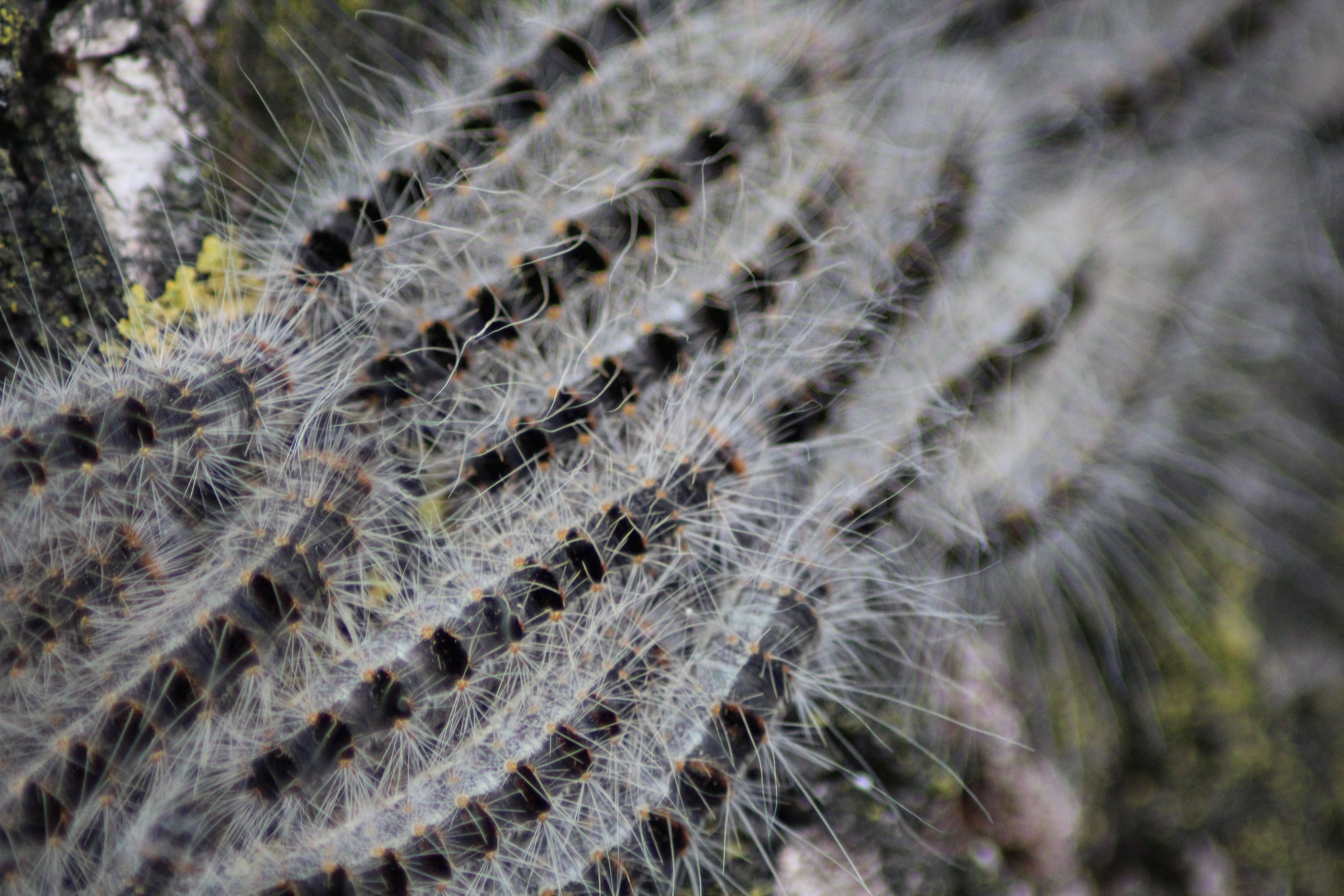
- Oak processionary caterpillars

Scientific classification
- Kingdom: Animalia
- Phylum: Arthropoda
- Clade: Pancrustacea
- Class: Insecta
- Order: Lepidoptera
- Superfamily: Noctuoidea
- Family: Notodontidae
- Genus: Thaumetopoea
- Species: T. processionea

Binomial name
- Thaumetopoea processionea (Linnaeus, 1758)

= Oak processionary =

Species of moth

The oak processionary (OPM) (Thaumetopoea processionea) is a moth whose caterpillars can be found in oak forests, where they feed on oak leaves, causing significant damage. They travel in nose-to-tail processions (hence their name), often arrow-headed, with a leader followed by rows of several caterpillars abreast. They are a human irritant because of their venomous setae (specifically urticating hairs), which can cause skin irritation and asthma. The species was first described by Carl Linnaeus in his 1758 10th edition of Systema Naturae.

== Description ==
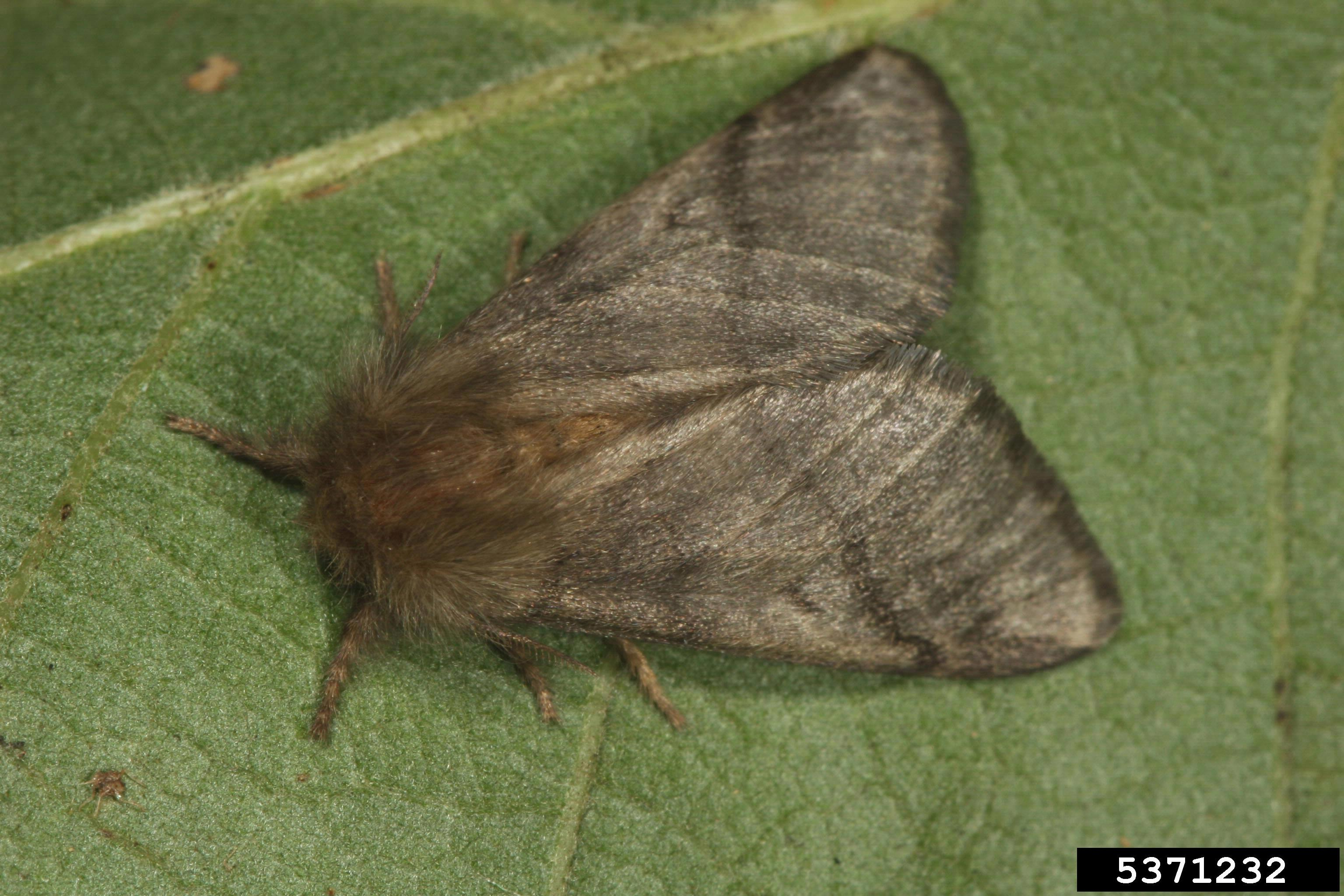
The imago (adult stage)

The wingspan of adult stage moth is between 25 and 35 millimetres (0.98 and 1.38 in). Their pattern of tan, brown and white makes the adults difficult to see against oak bark. Adults fly during July and August. The larvae construct communal nests of white silk from which they crawl at night in single file, head to tail in large processions to feed on foliage in the crowns of trees, returning in the same manner.

Oak is its preferred food source, but the moth also eats the leaves of hazel, hornbeam, sweet chestnut, birch and beech.

== Identification ==
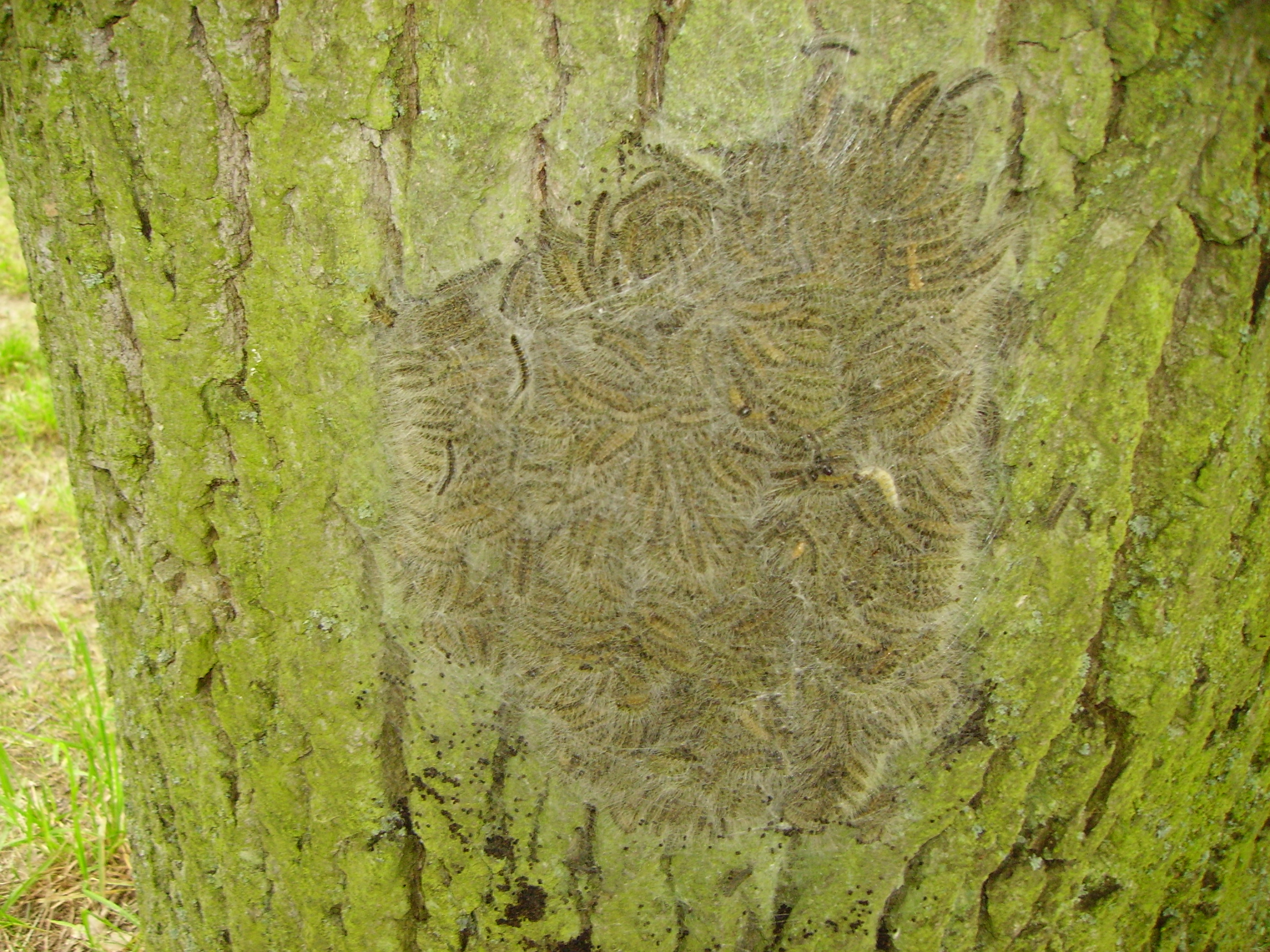
The nest with caterpillars on the trunk of an oak tree

The caterpillars live and feed almost exclusively on oak trees. They may march in procession across the ground between oak trees, and cluster together as they feed on oak leaves. In early summer they build silk nests on the trunks and branches, but not in the leaves, of oak trees, and leave silk trails on the trunks and branches. The nests and trails are originally white and visible, but soon become discoloured and hard to see.

The nests may be hemispherical, teardrop shaped, bag-like, and blanket-like (surrounding part of a trunk or branch), and may be at any height on the tree. The diameter may range from about 25 mm (one inch) to stretching several meters up the trunk. The caterpillars stay in these nests during the day between feeding periods, and later in the summer they remain in the nests to pupate into adult moths.

The caterpillars are mostly found in oak trees or on the ground under them in late spring and early summer, and do not live on fences, walls, etc. as other caterpillars do. They have very long, white hairs contrasting markedly with shorter hairs. The caterpillars of several other species may be mistaken for the oak processionary.

== Distribution ==
The moths are widely distributed in central and southern Europe, and are occasionally found as far north as Sweden. In the southern countries of Europe the populations are controlled by natural predators, but these predators are not present in northern Europe. Their range is expanding northward, possibly or partly as a result of global warming. The moth now has an established population in the UK. The eggs arrived on oak imported to the Richmond and Ealing areas of London in 2006 and the range of the species in the UK has been steadily expanding despite efforts to eradicate it. In Ireland, an outbreak of oak processionary moth was detected in June 2023 but was successfully eradicated. Ireland subsequently retained its Protected Zone status, with the pest officially recorded as "Absent, pest eradicated" following official surveys.

== Public health problem ==
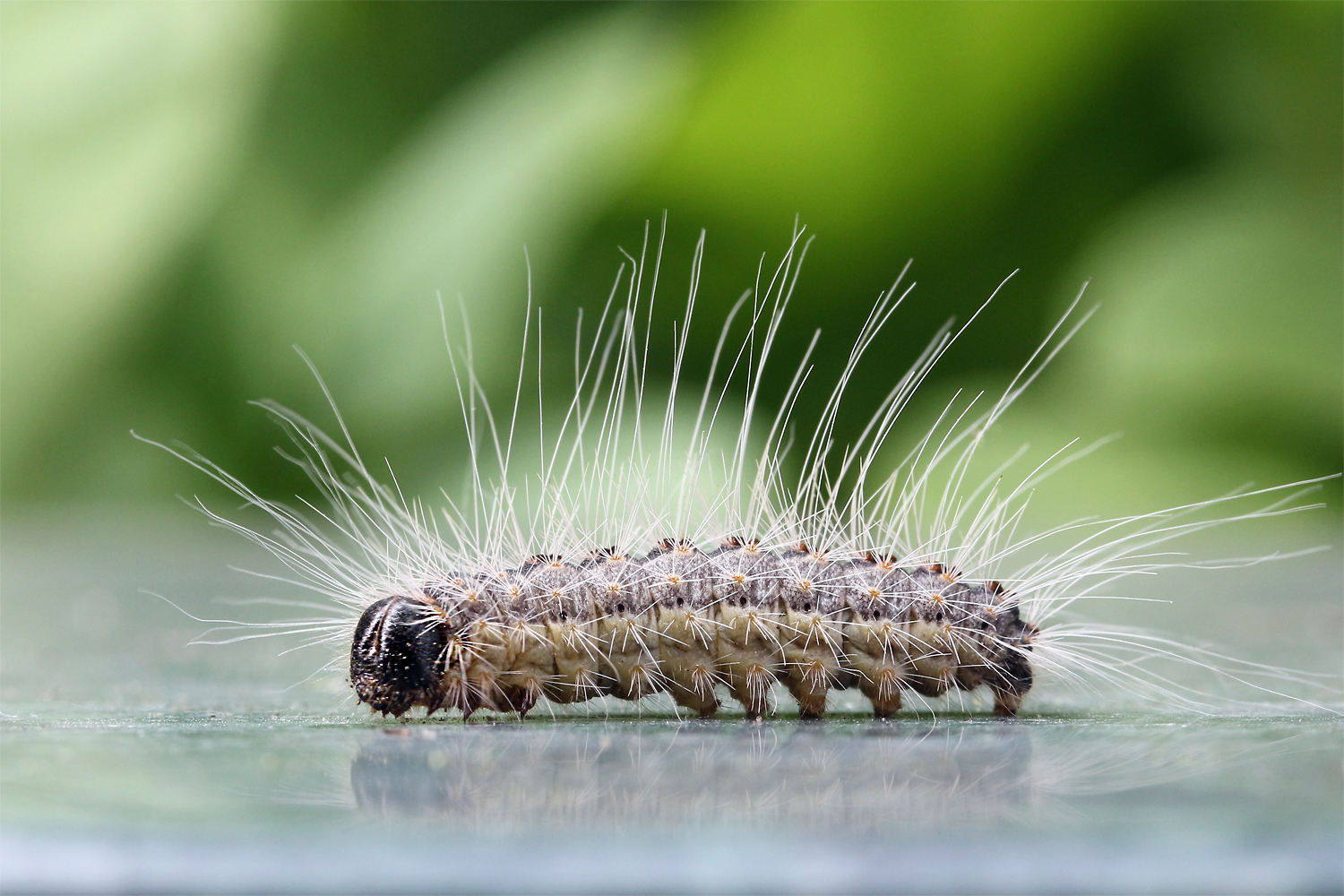
Caterpillar

The moths pose an increasing nuisance to humans as their range is extended. The backs of older caterpillars (3rd to 6th instars) are covered with up to 63,000 pointed defensive bristles, sized between 0.2 and 0.3 millimeters, which contain an urticating toxin, the protein thaumetopoein. These setae break off readily, become airborne and can cause epidemic caterpillar dermatitis (lepidopterism), manifested as a papular rash, pruritus, conjunctivitis and, if inhaled, pharyngitis and respiratory distress, including asthma or even anaphylaxis.

It has been found that the skin irritation and itching caused by contact with these hairs can be largely eliminated by the use of cetirizine-based antihistamine tablets.

Transmission of the setae can be airborne, by ground contact via plants or grass or even by water contact in stillwater e.g. garden ponds. They remain toxic beyond the life cycle of the moth and in some cases can remain a problem for several seasons. Mowing a lawn can bring a person into contact with these hairs. One alternative is to adopt a grass mulching technique to reduce possible contact, and to speed up the biological breakdown of the irritant hairs.

== Damage to trees ==
Large populations can strip trees bare, leaving them weakened and vulnerable to other threats.

== Control ==
Nests can be removed, or the caterpillars sprayed with pesticides soon after they hatch. However, neither approach is 100% effective. Male moths can be trapped in pheromone traps; this does not significantly reduce the population, but provides an indication of moth distribution.

=== United Kingdom ===
The caterpillars were accidentally introduced to the UK in 2005, almost certainly as eggs on live oak plants imported from continental Europe. Later distribution of the pest probably arose from several similar introductions, in addition to spread from the original point of introduction. By 2019 they had spread to all 33 London boroughs, and the Government had spent £37 million trying to control them. The general public have been asked to look out for these caterpillars and to report them, rather than deal with them themselves. The London Boroughs of Brent, Ealing, Hounslow and Richmond upon Thames set up task forces to deal with outbreaks. Sightings of these caterpillars in other areas should be reported to the Forestry Commission, whose research agency issued guidance on the way to contain outbreaks and deal with infestations, so as not to increase the risk to the public.

On 31 March 2008 an emergency amendment added the moth to the list of pests in The Plant Health (Forestry) Order 2005, and has required all oak trees coming into the UK from the rest of Europe to have Plant Passports.

In 2013 the Forestry Commission announced helicopters would be deployed to "blanket spray woodland" where the caterpillars posed a health threat.

In 2015 fifteen OPM nests were found in Hampstead Heath, Highgate Wood and Queen's Park; in 2018 over 2,000 were found at those sites. In April 2018 an outbreak of the caterpillars was declared in Greater London and surrounding areas. In Spring 2019 more were reported at Bracknell by the BBC News website, and a number were also found in Virginia Water.

On 15 July 2019 strengthened measures on the import of most species of oak into England were introduced to protect native trees from the threat of the pest.

In July 2023 the Forestry Commission sprayed woodland at Long Eaton, Derbyshire in an effort to control a local outbreak, with a five year plan to monitor the control measures.

=== Belgium ===
The moth is reported as being fairly common in Belgium, notably in the Campine but also elsewhere, the population fluctuating from year to year. In 2007 infestations in the province of Limburg were so acute that soldiers were deployed to burn them.

=== Netherlands ===
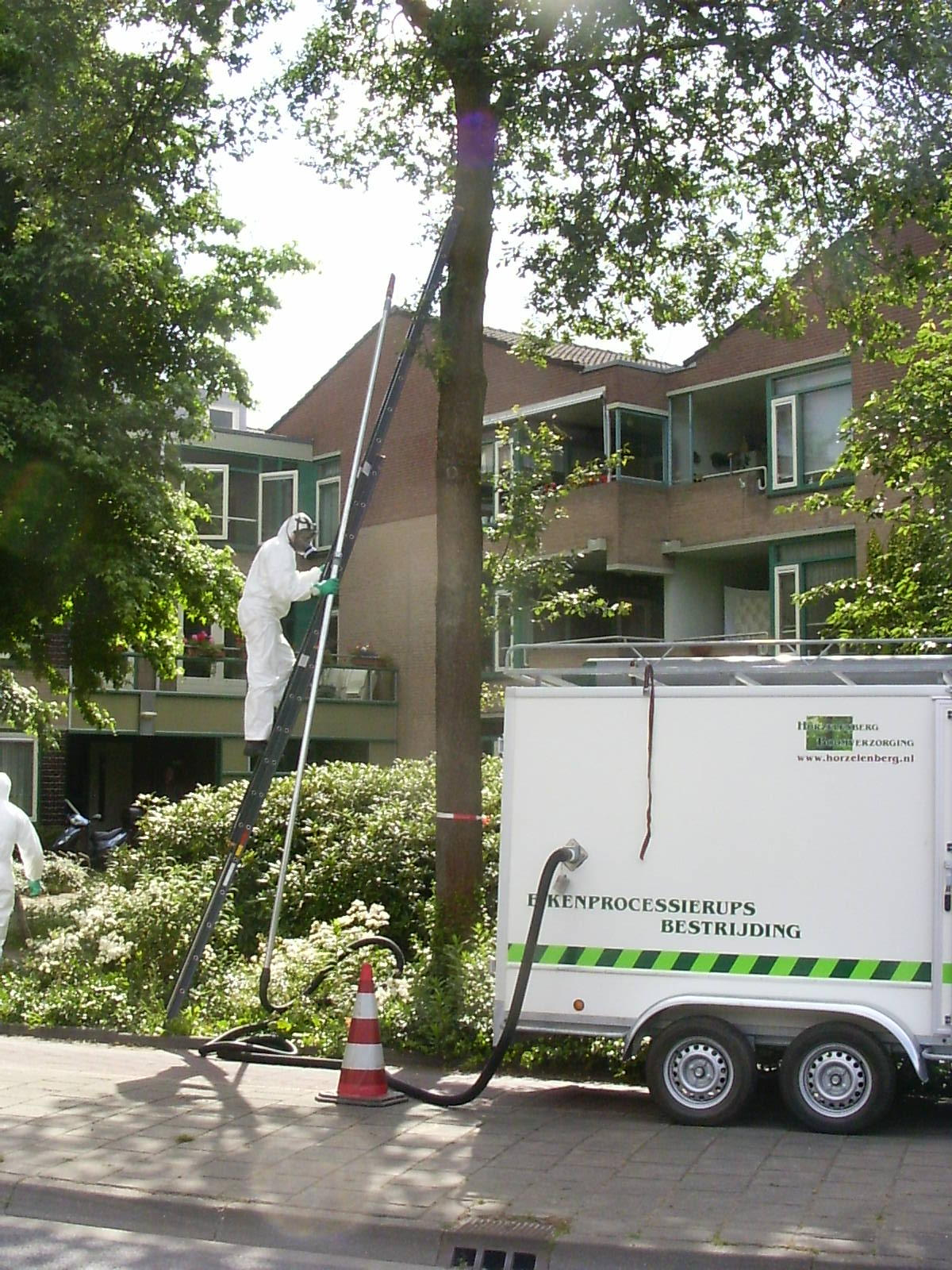
Control with vacuum cleaner in the Netherlands

In the Netherlands, the caterpillars are dealt with by biological pest control. As in Germany, local authorities use fluids containing Bt toxins, a biological pesticide. These fluids are sprayed onto the infected trees. In cases of serious contamination, the use of relatively mild chemical pest killers has been allowed by local authorities.

An experiment with bird houses for the great tit began in 2016. It has been observed that great tits like to eat the young, not yet hairy caterpillars in April.

Because chemicals may be harmful to other insects, an alternative is to use vacuuming equipment to remove the caterpillars and then incinerating them.

== See also ==
- Pine processionary
