= Karl Wilhelm Letzner =

German entomologist and teacher (1812–1889)

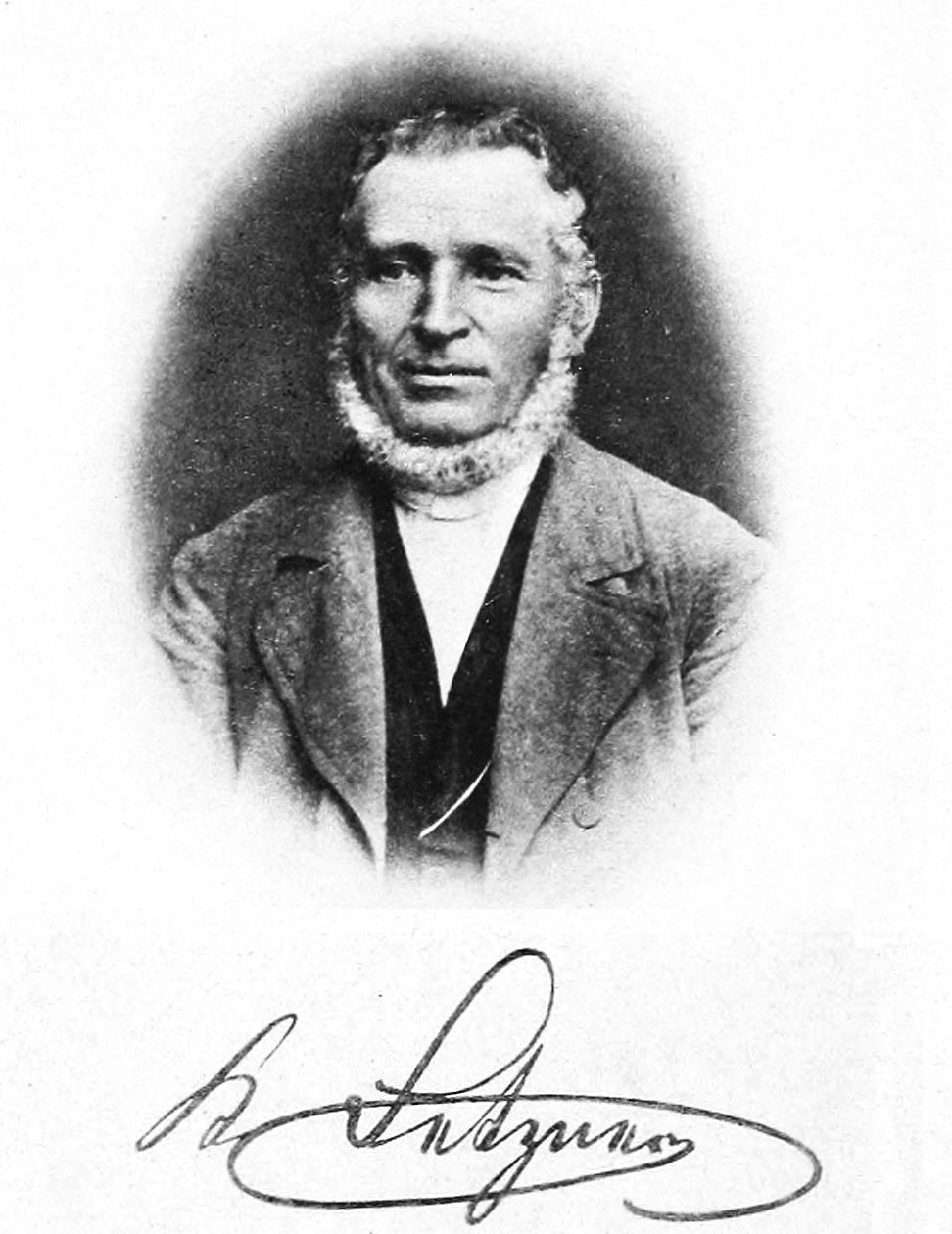

Karl Wilhelm Letzner (13 June 1812 – 15 December 1889) was a Silesian high school teacher and entomologist. He has been considered a pioneer of Silesian entomology and he documented the beetle fauna of south-western Poland.

== Biography ==
Letzner was born in Grabitz (Gajowice, today part of Wrocław) in the family of a tailor. He went to school at Grabitz and Graebschen and on the recommendation of the school inspector he was given free schooling at the Morgenbesser Latin School which later became the Realgymnasium zum heiligen Geist. He excelled and was made first decurio in 1826 and began to work as an assistant to the blind teacher Johann Georg Knie who was producing a directory of places in Silesia. He became especially interested in botany under the teacher Christian Scholz. He began to teach from 1834 and in 1838 he became a member of the entomological section of the Silesian Society of Native Culture. In 1840 he published a description of a new species of beetle from the region. He began to collaborate with Theodor Emil Schummel and this led to a resurgence in his entomological researches. He was especially interested in the beetles and collected extensively from Ustroń in the Silesian Beskids and the Praděd massif in the Hrubý Jeseník Mountains. He also collected leafhoppers because his methods often involved beating vegetation and collecting using an umbrella. He also visited other parts of Europe including Sylt, Hungary, Tyrol, Italy and Sweden. His career spanned teaching in four schools and he retired as rector at school number 16. He served as a president of the Verein für Schlesische Insektenkunde. He published a series of annual summaries on the beetles of the region under the title Über den Status der Coleopteren-Arten Schlesiens Ende des Jahres. Among the species that Letzner described are Crenitis punctatostriata (Letzner, 1841), Cantharis sudetica Letzner, 1847; Smaragdina diversipes (Letzner, 1840) and Dibolia schillingii (Letzner, 1847). Letzner also began to catalogue the larval stages.
